= Bogolin =

Bogolin Боголин
- Village
- Location of Bogolin
- Coordinates: 41°33′N 23°58′E
- Country: Bulgaria
- Province (Oblast): Blagoevgrad
- Municipality (Obshtina): Satovcha

Government
  - Mayor: Biser Karailiev (CEDB)

Area
  - Total: 5.344 km^{2} (2.063 sq mi)
- Elevation: 947 m (3,107 ft)

Population (2010-12-15)
  - Total: 451
- Time zone: UTC+2 (EET)
  - Summer (DST): UTC+3 (EEST)
- Postal Code: 2931
- Area code: 07547

Bogolin (Bulgarian: Боголин) is a village in Southwestern Bulgaria. It is located in the Satovcha Municipality, Blagoevgrad Province.

== Geography ==
The village of Bogolin is located in the Western Rhodope Mountains near the river Chechka Bistritsa a few kilometers away from the border with Greece. The nearest villages are Ablanitsa, Valkosel and Kribul. Bogolin belongs to the Chech region.

== History ==
According to the legend, the village was founded by a person called Begalin Chumarya who emigrated from the village of Valkosel. Chumarya settled at the location that is now Bogolin and gave the village its name.

In 1873 Bogolin (Bobolina) had a male population of 28 Pomaks and 12 houses. According to Vasil Kanchov, in 1900, Bogolin (Боболинъ) was populated by 65 Bulgarian Muslims. According to another statistic by Kanchov, at about the same time there were 13 houses in the village. According to Stephan Verkovic, at the end of the 19th century the village had a male population of 40 Pomaks and 12 houses.

== Religion ==
The population is Muslim and consists of Pomaks.

== Notable people ==
- Emil Biserov Yurukov - former member of parliament
