= Mavrochori, Drama =

Abandoned village in Eastern Macedonia, Greece

Mavrochori Μαυροχώρι
- Settlement
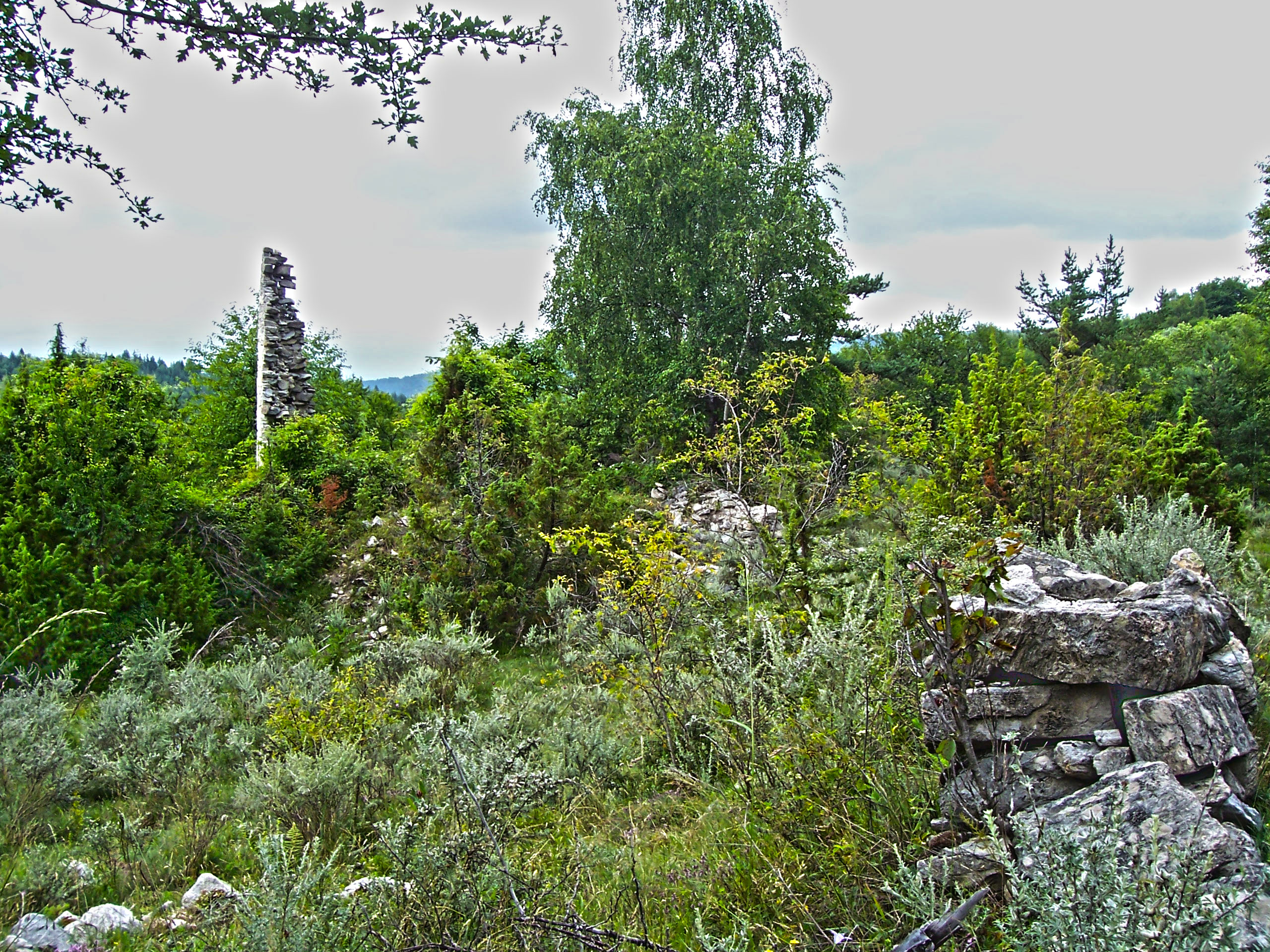
- The ruins of the mosque in the village

- Location within Greece
- Coordinates: 41°30′N 24°7′E
- Country: Greece
- Administrative region: East Macedonia and Thrace
- Regional unit: Drama
- Municipality: Kato Nevrokopi
- Elevation: 1,245 m (4,085 ft)

Population (1940)
  - Total: 87
- Time zone: UTC+2 (EET)
  - Summer (DST): UTC+3 (EEST)

Mavrochori (Greek: Μαυροχώρι, Katharevousa Μαυροχώριον), until 1927 known as Tisova (Greek: Τίσοβα, Bulgarian: Тисово), is an abandoned village in the Drama regional unit, Greece. The settlement, which became part of the community of Mylopetra in 1931, was dissolved in 1940.

== Geography ==
Mavrochori is situated in the Chech region on the South-Western slopes of the Rhodope Mountains, about 1,5 km south of the Pochan River near the border with Bulgaria. The nearest populated villages are Brashten and Tuhovishta in Bulgaria and Potamoi in Greece. The ruins of the village of Pochan are on the other side of the Pochan River. Mavrochori consists of two quarters - the newer Tsiropska and the older Parpelska where, according to one of the legends, Mehmed Sinap once lived. The main Roman road from Thrace to Thessaloniki passes through the Tsiropska quarter where a Roman bridge is to be found.

== History ==
The village has been first mentioned in an Ottoman document from 1464-65 under the name Tisina with Papelova. Papelova or Papil later became integrated part of the village and the name evolved to Parpelska Mahala. In this document all inhabitants of the two villages are listed. The population consists of Muslims and non-Muslims. The Muslims are just one family where the non-Muslims are 31 households, 6 unmarried and 4 widows. The village is mentioned once again in 1478-79 as Tisova with non-Muslim population: 85 households, 6 unmarried and 4 widows. The village appears again in a registry from 1519 with 46 households, 9 unmarried and 5 widows. Tisovo is also mentioned in 1530 with its population consisting of both Muslims and non-Muslims. The Muslims are 2 households and 1 unmarried whereas the non-Muslims are 37 households, 6 unmarried and 4 widows. Tisovо is also mentioned in an Ottoman Jizya registry from the 13th of March 1660. The register lists the number of Jizya units for each village of the Nevrokop Wilayah whereas Mavrochori (Tisova) is listed as a village with 15 such. The village is mentioned again in 1723 with 16 Muslim households and a Mosque.

The village is also mentioned in the book Ethnographie des Vilayets d'Andrianople, de Monastir et de Salonique published in 1878 which lists the number of the male population as of 1873. Mavrochori (Tisovo) is registered as a village with 140 male Pomaks and 50 households. According to Vasil Kanchov, as of the end of the 19th century, there were 200 houses in the village. He mentions that Mavrochori (Tisovo) is the largest village in Chech and that a weekly bazaar was held near the village. In his book Macedonia — ethnography and statistics published in 1900 Kanchov writes that the number of the inhabitants of Tisovo is 400 - all of them Bulgarian Muslims. At the end of the 19th century Mavrochori (Tisovo) is mentioned as a village with 162 male Pomak inhabitants and 50 houses by Stefan Verković.

After the Balkan Wars Mavrochori was acceded to Greece in 1913. The village (Tisovo, Τίσοβα) was populated by 682 inhabitants in 1913 according to a Greek statistic. According to the statistic from 1920 at that time the village had 405 inhabitants.

In 1923/4 the Pomaks were expelled from the village to Turkey and settled in the town of Demirköy according to the Treaty of Lausanne and Greek refugees from Turkey were settled in their place. Up to 1928 the number of the refugees settled in Mavrochori had reached 47 and the number of the Greek families 15. In 1927 the name of the village was changed from Tisova (Τίσοβα) to Mavrochori (Μαυροχώρι). In 1928 the population had reached 187 inhabitants (including about 40 soldiers stationed at the border outpost in the village) and in 1940 - 87 inhabitants (including about 20 soldiers).

The village was abandoned during the Greek Civil War and was never reconstructed.
