= Dolen, Blagoevgrad Province =

Dolen Долен
- Village
- Location of Dolen
- Coordinates: 41°37′N 23°56′E
- Country: Bulgaria
- Province (Oblast): Blagoevgrad
- Municipality (Obshtina): Satovcha

Government
  - Mayor: Valentina Mitsikuleva (CEDB)

Area
  - Total: 29.294 km^{2} (11.310 sq mi)
- Elevation: 852 m (2,795 ft)

Population (2010-12-15)
  - Total: 410
- Time zone: UTC+2 (EET)
  - Summer (DST): UTC+3 (EEST)
- Postal Code: 2968
- Area code: 07549
- License plate: E

Dolen (Bulgarian: Долен) is a village in southwestern Bulgaria, located in the Satovcha Municipality of the Blagoevgrad Province.

== Geography ==
The village of Dolen is located in the Western Rhodope Mountains, near the river Chechka Bistritsa. It belongs to the Chech region.

== History ==
=== Prehistoric and Antiquity ===
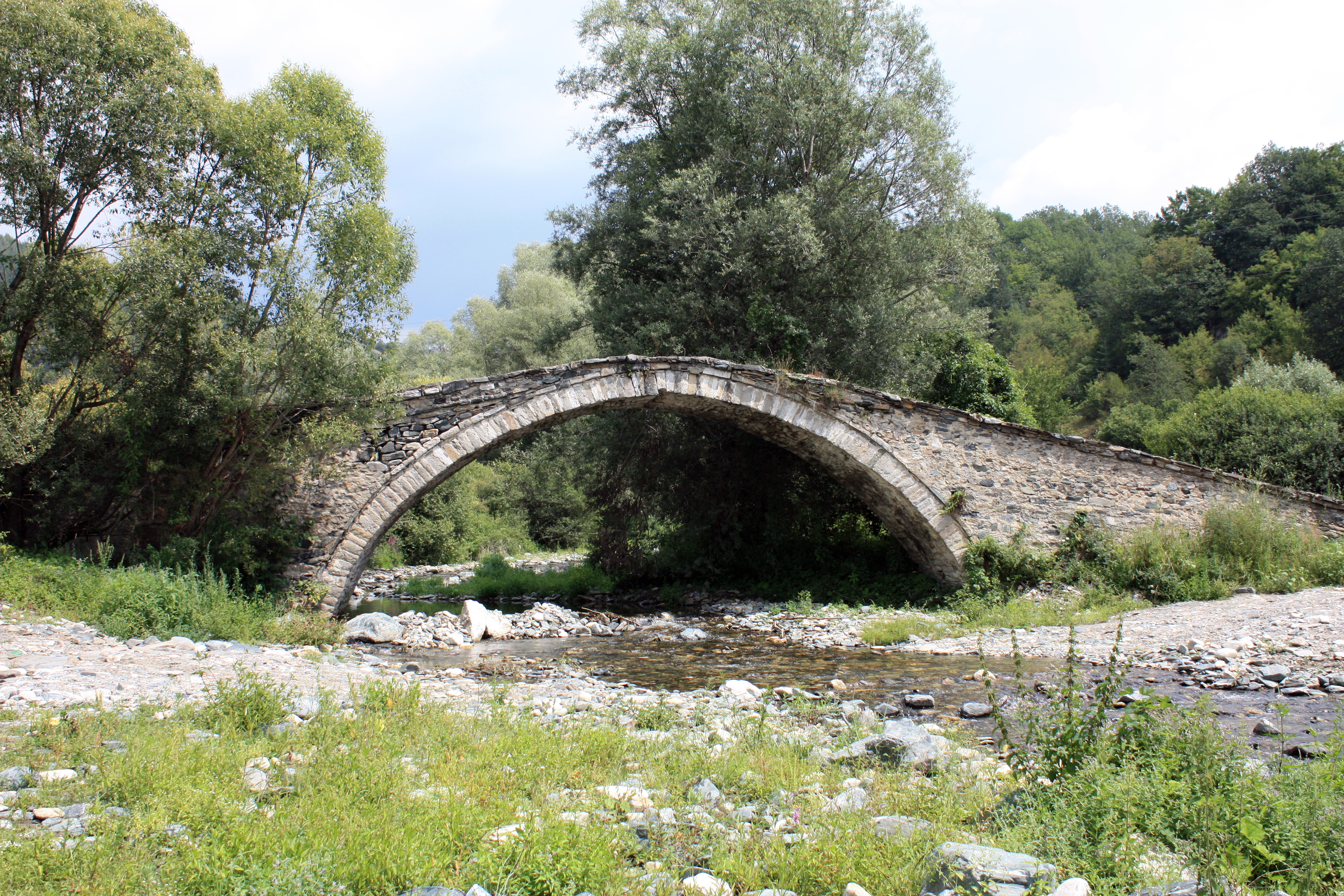
Ancient Roman bridge over the river Chechka Bistritsa

Prior to Dolen's existence, the area was strewed with Thracians hamlets, the remains of which can still be seen around the village. The hills surrounding the village are scattered with Thracian necropolises. Preserved are also the Thracian vineyards which were used until the Bulgarian National Revival.

Dolen is located on a Roman-Thracian road which used to connect Drama with Trimoncium, the Roman name of today's city of Plovdiv. Proof for the existence of this historic route are remains from the road itself at the eastern part of the village as well as the Roman bridge in the district of Banyan.

During the 1st century AD, the Romans moved the road-bed for military purposes, and built a new bridge close to the village of Kribul, thus assuring the passing of their troops along sunlit roads. As a result, Dolen remained isolated from the main stream of troops and convoys.

=== Under the Ottoman rule ===
During the Ottoman rule, Dolen, Satovcha and Kovachevitsa remained the only villages with Christian population in the region.

After the ascension of sultan Selim II all the 12 chapels in Dolen were burned, the land was declared property of the sultan, and a mosque was built. The bey resided in a luxurious house located on the Northern side of the river, which has been preserved up until this date.

During that time, the region was teeming with livestock, and the land around the village was once used for vineyards. However, an unknown disease destroyed completely this rare sort of grapes which used to thrive 900 m. above the sea-level.

In addition to being wine producers and livestock producers, the local craftsmen were also known for being good masons. Each one of the 300 houses in the village has a unique architectural design.

Until 1856, Dolen's school was а monastery school and is located in the precincts of a church. From the school year 1871–1872 the teacher Nikola Popfilipov, born in the town of Bansko introduced the Monitorial system education method.

The "Ethnography of the Vilayets Andrianopol, Monastir and Salonika", which was published in Constantinopol in 1878 and provided statistics about the male population in 1873, indicates that Dolen had 149 households, 60 Pomaks and 430 Bulgarians.

According to Vasil Kanchov, as of the 19th century the village of Doljan was populated by 1170 Bulgarian Muslims and 352 Bulgarians-Christians.

== Religions ==
Both, Muslims and Christians inhabit the village.

== Culture ==
Dolen is famous with its 350 old houses – an example of 19th century Rhodopean architecture. The houses are typically built with overhanging top stories and the roofs are made out of stone plates. Some ceilings are decorated with wood carvings.

During archeological excavations, near Dolen were found an ancient village, a late ancient village, a late ancient necropolis, a late ancient fortress, a late medieval church, and the remains of a smeltery.

In 1977 the village is declared a historical cultural reserve.

One of the main attractions is the St. Nicholas Church, built in 1834 in a monastery school complex . The sacred images comprising the iconostasis of the church were painted by George Filipov, a painter from the region of Debar, who later moved and lived in Gabrovo. Other attractions include the street junction, known as "Kavalite" ("Кавалите"), the "Nikolovski Fountain" ("Николовската чешма") and the main street.

The narrow cobblestone streets are typical for the village.

The church bells were founded 7 times until the perfect sound was achieved. The sound of the bells can be heard in a radius of 8 kilometers.
