= Chechka Bistritsa =

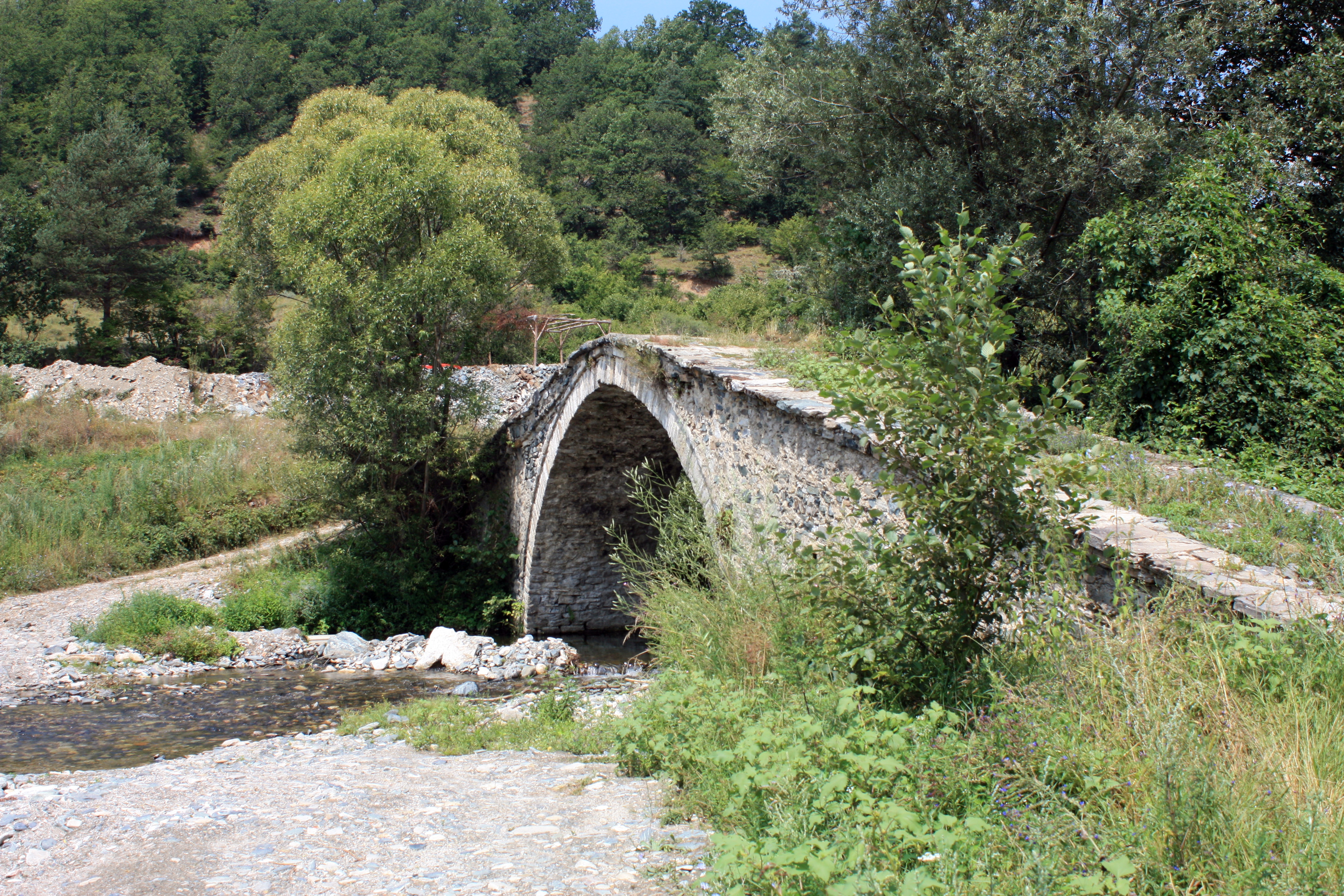

Location
- Country: Bulgaria

Physical characteristics
- Source
  - location: Dabrash, Rhodope Mountains
  - coordinates: 41°44′7.08″N 23°58′53.04″E
  - elevation: 1,695 m (5,561 ft)
- Mouth
  - location: Mesta
  - coordinates: 41°30′2.16″N 23°56′42″E
  - elevation: 443 m (1,453 ft)
- Length: 49 km (30 mi)
- Basin size: 197 km^{2} (76 sq mi)

Basin features
- Progression: Nestos→ Aegean Sea

The Chechka Bistritsa (Bulgarian: Чечка Бистрица) is a 49 km-long river in southern Bulgaria, a left tributary of the river Mesta of the Aegean Sea basin. It flows through the historical region of Chech.

== Geography ==
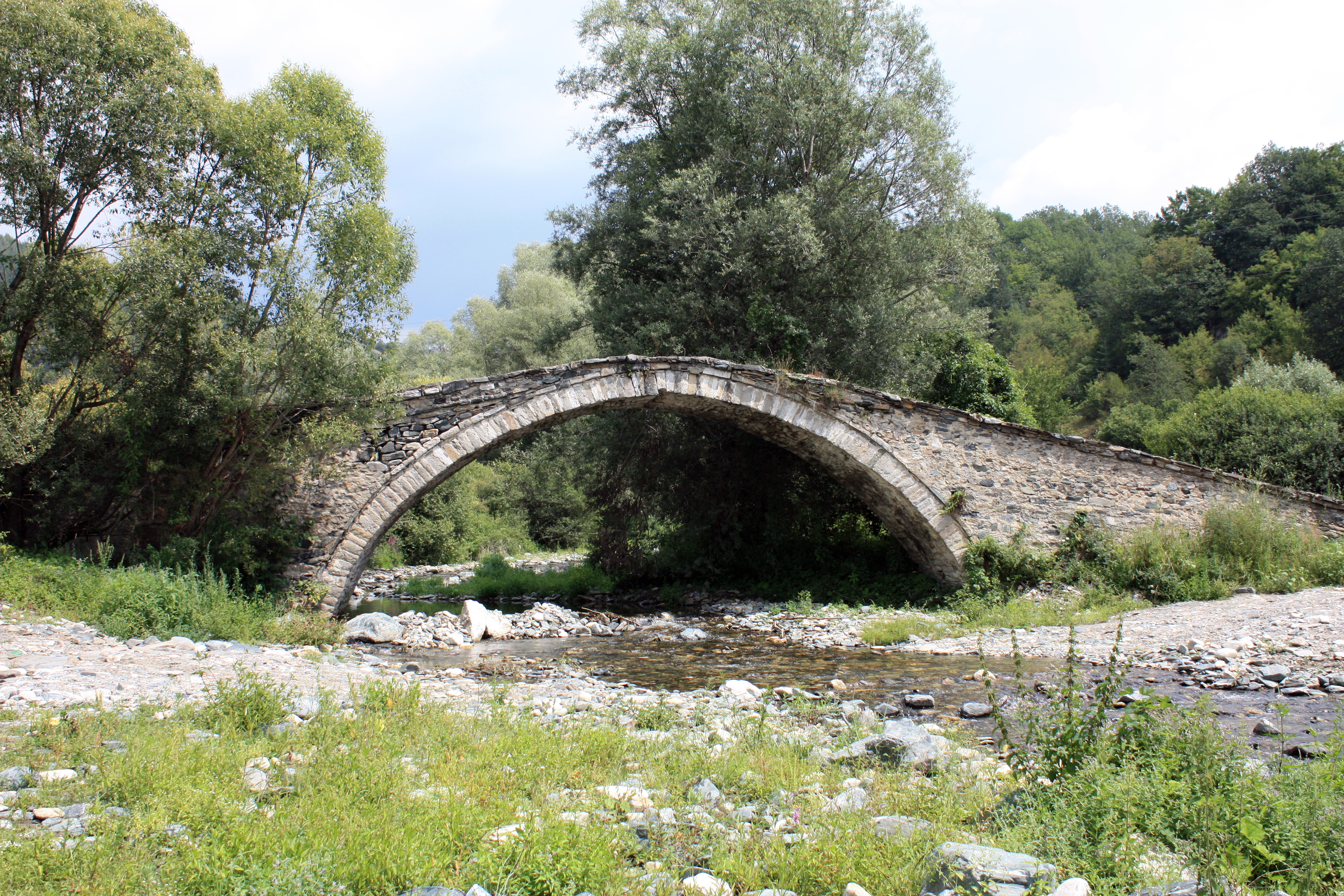
An old bridge over the river between Dolen and Pletena

The river takes its source under the name Pardikonsko dere at an altitude of 1,695 m at 1.6 km northeast of the summit of Sveti Petar (1,745 m) in the Dabrash ridge of the western Rhodope Mountains and drains the southwestern slopes of Dabrash. The river Kanina springs from the southern slopes of the same summit. The Chechka Bistritsa flows in a relatively shallow and heavily forested valley in southwestern directed for about 3 km, then turns southeast until the Dikchan state forestry, and then again continues to the southwest. It flows in that direction until the vicinity of the village of Dolno Dryanovo, where it turns south-southeast and enters the historical region of Chech, where the river valley widens. It flows into the Mesta at an altitude of 443 m some 1.6 km north of the village of Teplen, less than 2 km from the Bulgaria–Greece border.

Its drainage basin covers a territory of 197 km^{2} or 5.71% of Mesta's total.

The river has rain-snow feed with high water in April and low water in September. Its waters have low mineralisation, up to 200 mg/L.

== Settlements and economy ==
The river flows entirely in Blagoevgrad Province, through the municipalities of Satovcha, Garmen and Hadzhidimovo. There are no settlements along its course but several villages are perched over the Chechka Bistritsa, some of them less than a kilometer from the riverbed, including Pletena, Dolen, Dolno Dryanovo, Ablanitsa and Bogolin. A 7.5 km stretch of the third class III-197 road Gotse Delchev–Dospat–Devin follows its valley between the villages of Dolno Dryanovo and Pletena.

Part of the waters of the Chechka Bistritsa are diverted via eleven derivations and a tunnel under the Dabrash ridge to the upper course of the Dospat Reservoir, which forms the highest level of the Dospat–Vacha Hydropower Cascade (500.2 MW). In its lower course the waters are used for irrigation.
