= Zhizhevo =

Zhizhevo Жижево
- Village
- Zhizhevo/Blagoevgrad/Bulgaria
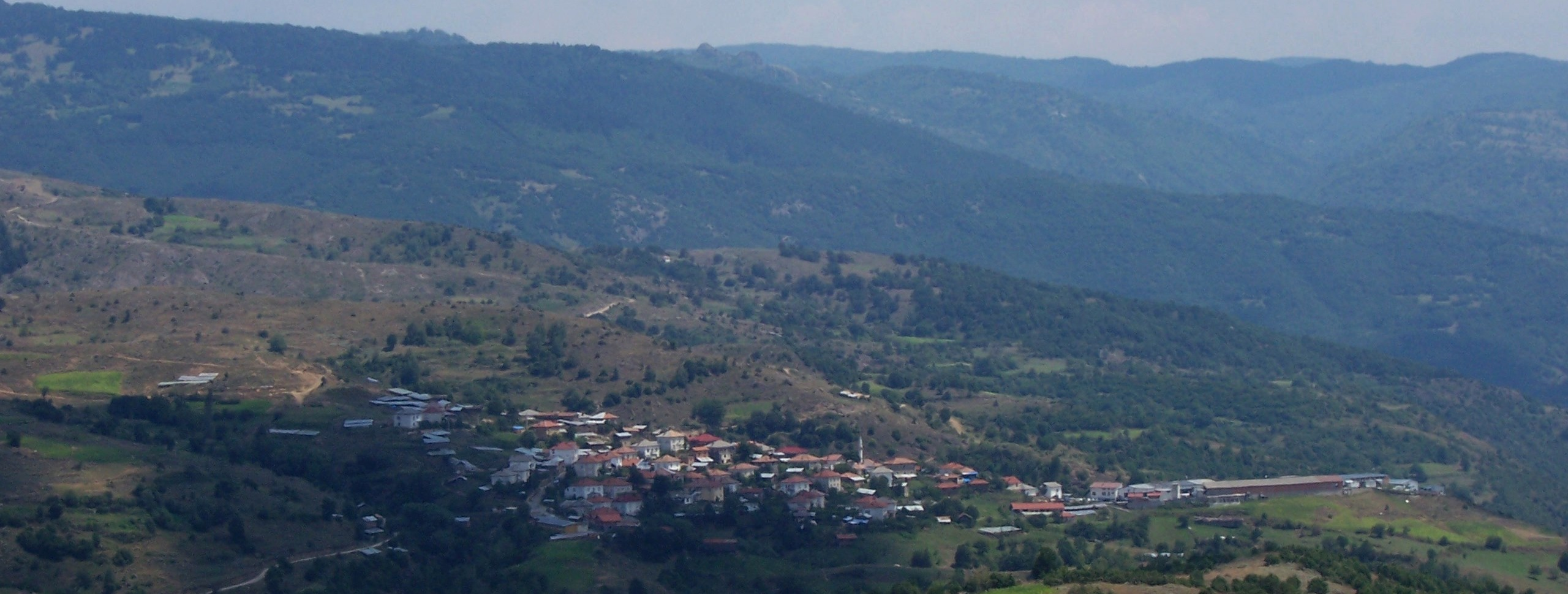

- Location of Zhizhevo
- Coordinates: 41°33′N 24°2′E
- Country: Bulgaria
- Province (Oblast): Blagoevgrad
- Municipality (Obshtina): Satovcha

Government
  - Mayor: Malin Koyrukov (DPS)

Area
  - Total: 14.668 km^{2} (5.663 sq mi)
- Elevation: 846 m (2,776 ft)

Population (15 December 2010)
  - Total: 380
- Time zone: UTC+2 (EET)
  - Summer (DST): UTC+3 (EEST)
- Postal Code: 2956
- Area code: 07545

Zhizhevo (Bulgarian: Жижево, old variants: Zhizhovo, Darzhilovo) is a village in Southwestern Bulgaria. It is located in the Satovcha Municipality, Blagoevgrad Province.

== Geography ==
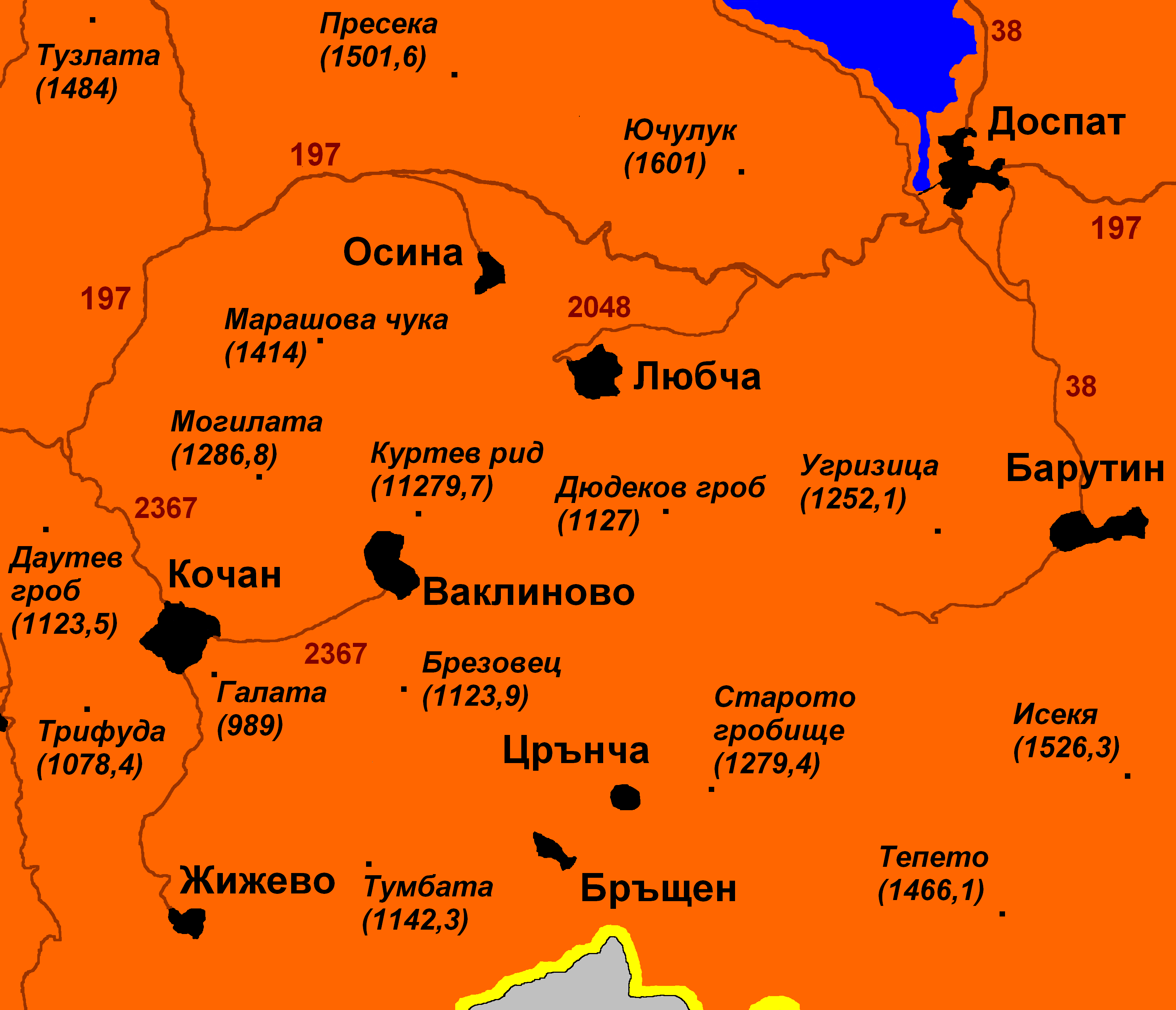
Zhizhevo Village and neighboring villages.

Zhizhevo Village is located in a mountain region. It falls into the historical and geographical Chech region. The highest point in the village is "Vysoka Mogilitsa" (Vysoka Mogila), and another peak is Tumbata (1142 meters). On the eastern side of the village flows the Dospat river, and on the western side the Kochanska Reka, which is called Zhizhevska by the village inhabitants. The two rivers merge on the border between Bulgaria and Greece. To the west of Zhizhevo is the village of Valkosel, to the north, it borders Kochan, to the east with Brashten, and to the south with Manastirdzhik. The climate in the village is transitional-Mediterranean.

=== Flora ===
In the Zhizhevo, there are natural oak and birch massifs, with birch forests today being preserved only in some places, due to their felling for the purpose of planting coniferous forests. About 50-100 years ago, the birch forest was very extensive and covered the areas of "Usoya", "Livade", "Osicha", "Poben Kamak", "Vriz", "Gornoto Grobe", "Lenishta" and other areas of the Zhizhovo land. In addition to birch and oak, there are also hornbeam, hazel, white and black alder, willow and others.

== History ==
According to Vasil Kanchov, in 1900 Zhizhevo was populated by 503 Bulgarian Muslims, living in 60 houses.

== Religions ==
The population is Muslim.

== Notable people ==
- Kamen Hadzhiev - professional football player of Rodopa Smolyan, Wattenscheid 09, Schalke 04, Pirin Gotse Delchev and Minyor Pernik.
