= Chech =

Geographical and historical region of the Balkan peninsula

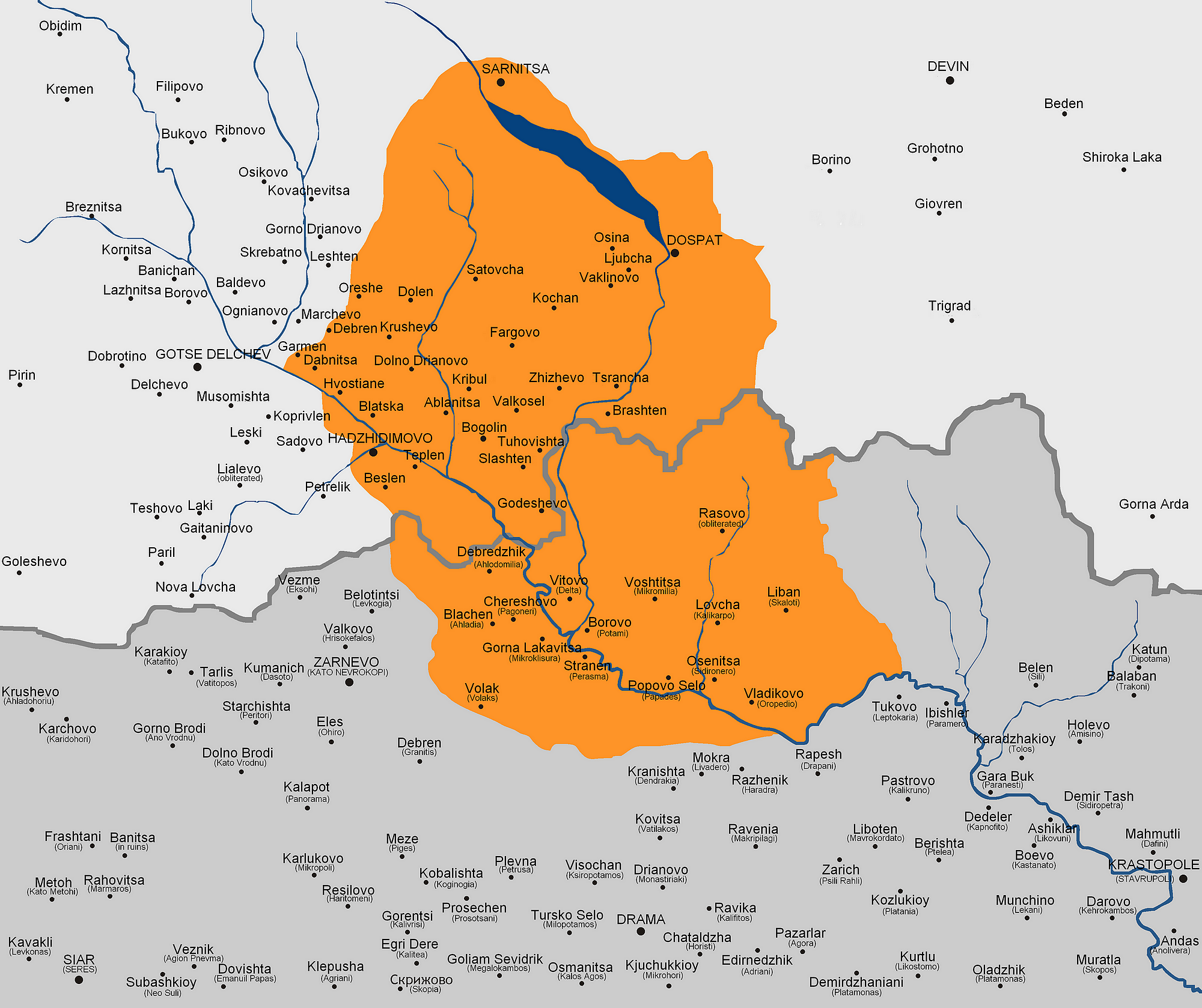
The Chech region in Bulgaria and Greece.

Chech (Bulgarian: Чеч) or Chechko (Bulgarian: Чечко) is a Bulgarian term describing a geographical and historical region of the Balkan peninsula in southeastern Europe in modern-day Bulgaria and Greece. It consists of about 60 settlements and was traditionally mostly Pomak with Orthodox Greek and Bulgarian minorities.

The Chech region is situated on the border of the much larger regions of Macedonia and Thrace. It covers the western Rhodope Mountains and the northern slopes of Falakro (Bulgarian: Боздаг, Bozdag). It is divided in two: Drama Chech and Nevrokopi Chech. The first one and partially the second one is in Greece.

According to Vasil Kanchov the eastern border of Chech is the Dospat River and the western one is the river of Dabnitsa. Thus the Chech comprises the municipalities: Satovcha, Dospat and the villages in the valleys of the Dospat River and Bistritsa river. The villages in the Greek Chech are part of Kato Nevrokopi municipality and Sidironero community. The Pomak population of the Greek part of Chech was exchanged with Turkey during the Greek-Turkish population exchange in 1923 and replaced with Orthodox Christians from Turkey. Many of the Chech villages in Greece are now abandoned.

== Settlements of Nevrokopski Chech ==
The major settlements of the northern part of Chech are enlisted by Vasil Kanchov in two of his works.

=== Settlements in Bulgaria ===
- Satovcha Municipality: Bogolin, Dolen, Fargovo, Godeshevo, Kochan, Kribul, Osina, Pletena, Satovcha, Slashten, Tuhovishta, Vaklinovo, Valkosel, Zhizhevo
- Dospat Municipality: Brashten, Ljubcha and Tsrancha
- Garmen Municipality: Dolno Dryanovo, Hvostiane, Krushevo, Oreshe
- Hadzhidimovo Municipality: Ablanitsa, Beslen, Blatska, Teplen

=== Settlements in Greece ===
- Drama municipality: Kastanohoma (Zarnovitsa), Mirsinero (Pepelash)
- Nevrokopi municipality: Agios Petros (Peruh), Agriokerasea (Izbishta), Ahladomilea (Debren), Delta (Vitovo), Diplohori (Dablen), Eklisaki (Manastir), Erimoklisia (Kolyarba), Katahloron (Rakishten), Kremasta (Lozna), Kritaristra (Kashitsa), Lakouda (Gorna Lakavitsa), Mavrohori (Tisovo), Melisomandra (Maloshijtsa), Mesovuni (Siderovo), Milopetra (Mazhdel), Mikroklisura (Dolna Lakavitsa), Mikromilia (Ustitsa), Perasma (Stranen), Pochan, Poliliton (Sarchan, Staredzik), Potami (Borovo), Psihron (Kosten), Shurdilovo, Virsan (Vrashten), Vrahohori (Boren)
- Sidironero community: Dobryadzil, Evrenes (Pulovo), Kainchen (Antilalos), Kalikarpo (Lovchishta), Kesariano (Ruskovo), Klista (Kolyush), Kokino (Barhovo), Limon (Rashovo), Magnisio (Grazhdel), Oropedio (Vladikovo), Papades (Popovo selo), Plakostroto (Glum), Sidironero, (Osenitsa), Skaloti (Liban), Stavrodromi (Orhovo), Voskotopi (Verdzhenitsa, Drazhenitsa), Vounohori (Pribojna), Vrahotopos (Kalchovo)

Italics indicates not inhabited settlement at the 2001 census.

== See also ==
- Veda Slovena
