= Pletena =

Pletena Плетена
- Village
- Location of Pletena
- Coordinates: 41°38′N 23°58′E
- Country: Bulgaria
- Province (Oblast): Blagoevgrad
- Municipality (Obshtina): Satovcha

Government
  - Mayor: Rumen Arnaudov (CEDB)

Area
  - Total: 54.076 km^{2} (20.879 sq mi)
- Elevation: 1,006 m (3,301 ft)

Population (2010-12-15)
  - Total: 1,857
- Time zone: UTC+2 (EET)
  - Summer (DST): UTC+3 (EEST)
- Postal Code: 2954
- Area code: 07541
- Vehicle registration: E

Pletena (Bulgarian: Плетена) is a village in Southwestern Bulgaria. It is located in the Satovcha Municipality, Blagoevgrad Province.

== Geography ==
The village of Pletena is located in the Western Rhodope Mountains near the river Chechka Bistritsa. It belongs to the Chech region.

== History ==
In 1873, Pletena had male population of 210 Pomaks and 80 houses. According to Vasil Kanchov, in 1900 Pletena was populated by 770 Bulgarian Muslims According to another statistic by Kanchov about the same time, there were 190 houses in the village. According to Stephan Verkovic, at the end of the 19th century, the village had male population of 275 Pomaks and 81 houses.

In 1969, while ploughing near the village of Pletena, a local farmer discovered a grave of a Thracian warrior. Soon after arriving, the archeologists discovered a helmet, a Rhomphaia, a pair of knee-pieces and six pieces of protection equipment for the neck, as well as, other smaller objects.

== Religions ==
The population is Muslim and consists of Pomaks.

== Cultural and natural landmarks ==
The cave Mechata dupka (The Bear's Hole) is 12 meters long with 2 meters denivelation (vertical rise).
