= Osina, Blagoevgrad Province =

Osina Осина
- Village
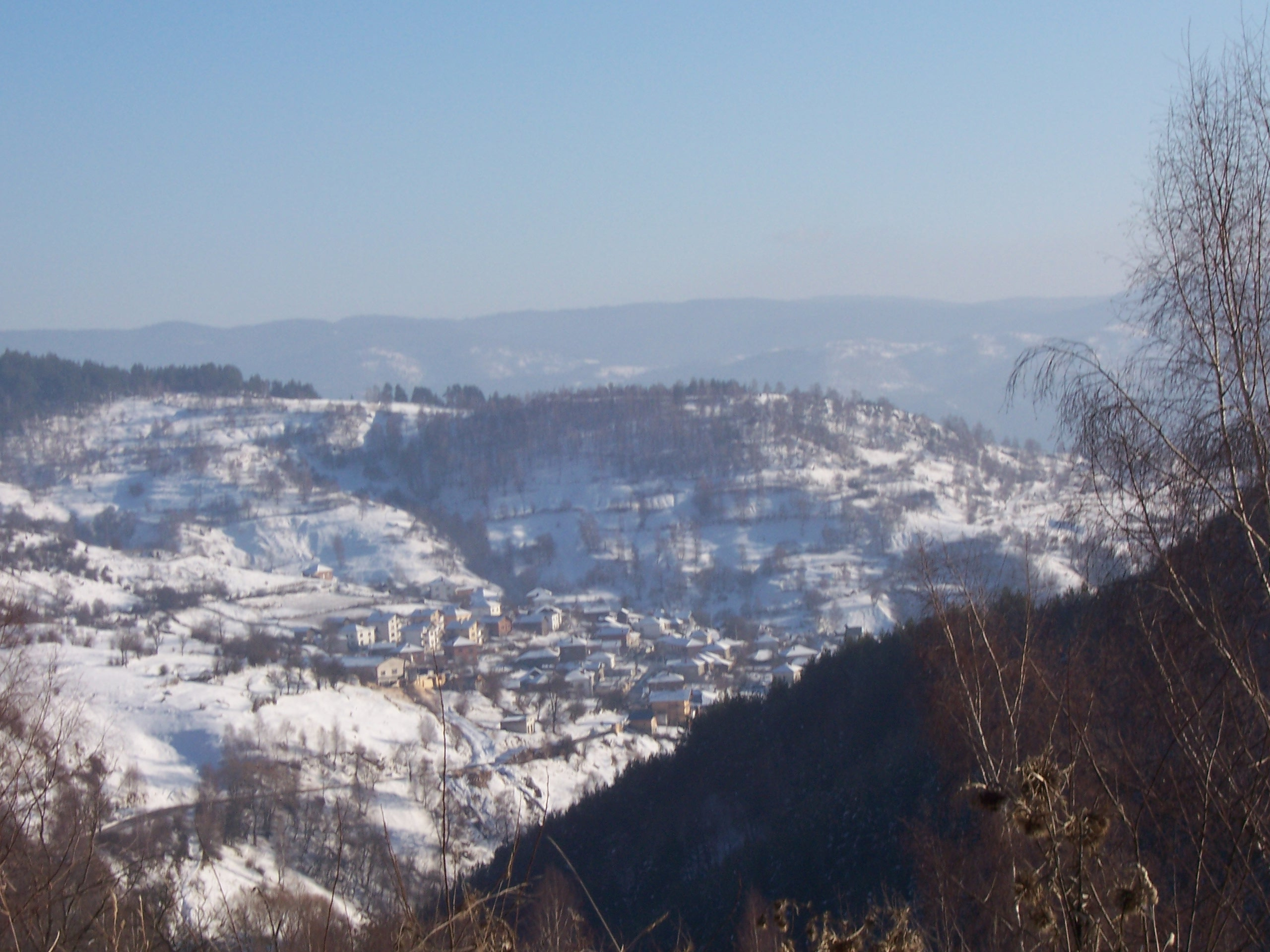

- Location of Osina
- Coordinates: 41°38′N 24°5′E
- Country: Bulgaria
- Province (Oblast): Blagoevgrad
- Municipality (Obshtina): Satovcha

Government
  - Mayor: Slavcho Hadzhiev (CEDB)

Area
  - Total: 25.543 km^{2} (9.862 sq mi)
- Elevation: 1,199 m (3,934 ft)

Population (2010-12-15)
  - Total: 599
- Time zone: UTC+2 (EET)
  - Summer (DST): UTC+3 (EEST)
- Postal Code: 2953
- Area code: 07544
- Vehicle registration: E

Osina (Bulgarian: Осина, old version: Usina) is a village in Southwestern Bulgaria. It is located in the Satovcha Municipality, Blagoevgrad Province.

== Geography ==
The village of Osina is located in the Western Rhodope Mountains. It belongs to the Chech region.

== History ==
The village of Osina was founded in the early 15th century when shepherds from the village of Kochan moved to the area where they maintained their dairies to avoid a plague outbreak. Over time additional refugees from the region around Serres settled in the village, though the exact timing and circumstances of their arrival remain unclear.

In 1873, Osina (Oussina) had a male population of 150 Pomaks and 50 houses. According to Vasil Kanchov, in 1900 Osina (Усина) was populated by 250 Bulgarian Muslims. Stephan Verkovic also noted that by the end of 19th century, the village had a male population of 173 Pomaks and 50 houses.

== Religions ==
The population is Muslim and consists of Pomaks.

== Cultural and natural landmarks ==
- Remains of a settlement from the Stone-Copper Age northwest from the village;
- Remains of a medieval settlement northeast from the village;
- Remains of a medieval settlement northwest from the village;
- Remains of a church west from the village;
- Remains of an old road near the village.
