= Fargovo =

Fargovo Фъргово
- Village
- Location of Fargovo
- Coordinates: 41°35′N 24°0′E
- Country: Bulgaria
- Province (Oblast): Blagoevgrad
- Municipality (Obshtina): Satovcha

Government
  - Mayor: Ventsislav Katsarov (MRF)

Area
  - Total: 11.871 km^{2} (4.583 sq mi)
- Elevation: 1,036 m (3,399 ft)

Population (2010-12-15)
  - Total: 473
- Time zone: UTC+2 (EET)
  - Summer (DST): UTC+3 (EEST)
- Postal Code: 2952
- Area code: 07545
- Vehicle registration: E

Fargovo (Bulgarian: Фъргово) is a village in Southwestern Bulgaria. It is located in the Satovcha Municipality, Blagoevgrad Province.

== Geography ==
The village of Fargovo is located in the Western Rhodope Mountains. It belongs to the Chech region.

== History ==
In 1873 Fargovo (Fregovo) had male population of 45 Pomaks and 140 houses. According to Vasil Kanchov, in 1900 Fargovo (Фъргово) was populated by 260 Bulgarian Muslims According to another statistic by Kanchov about the same time there were 45 houses in the village. According to Stephan Verkovic at the end of the 19th century the village had male population of 168 Pomaks and 45 houses.

== Religions ==
The population is Muslim and consists of Pomaks.
