= Godeshevo =

Godeshevo Годешево
- Village
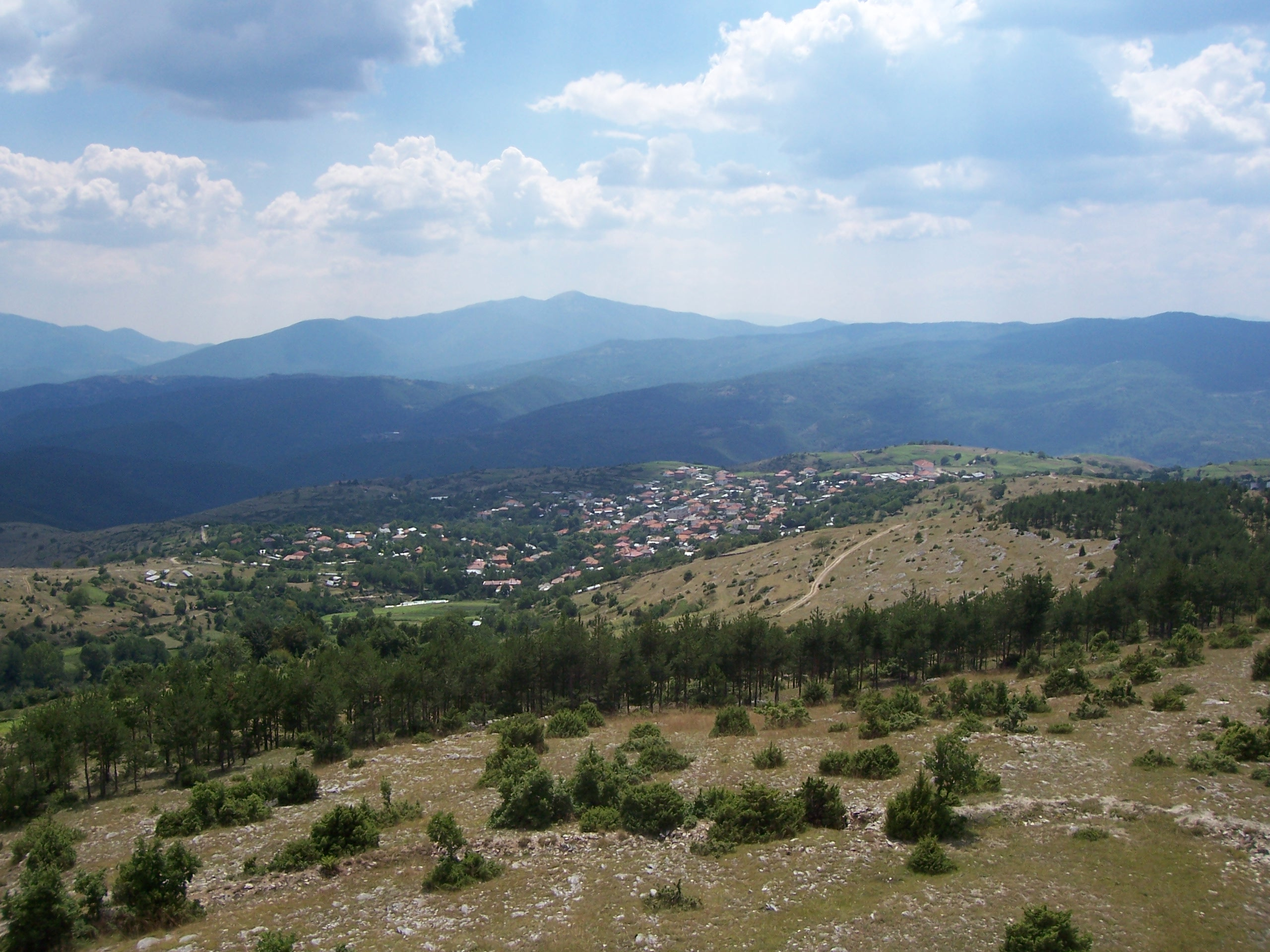

- Location of Godeshevo
- Coordinates: 41°28′N 24°3′E
- Country: Bulgaria
- Province (Oblast): Blagoevgrad
- Municipality (Obshtina): Satovcha

Government
  - Mayor: Evelina Cholakova (MRF)

Area
  - Total: 11.456 km^{2} (4.423 sq mi)
- Elevation: 714 m (2,343 ft)

Population (2010-12-15)
  - Total: 889
- Time zone: UTC+2 (EET)
  - Summer (DST): UTC+3 (EEST)
- Postal Code: 2938
- Area code: 07548
- Vehicle registration: E

Godeshevo (Bulgarian: Годешево) is a village in Southwestern Bulgaria. It is located in the Satovcha Municipality, Blagoevgrad Province.

== Geography ==
The village of Godeshevo is located in the Western Rhodope Mountains. It belongs to the Chech region.

== History ==
In the vicinity of Gudeshevo after archeological research were found the remains of a medieval settlement and late medieval church. Accidentally in the place called Radevi laki nearby the village were found 24 bronze coins from the 6th century of the emperors Anastasius I, Justin I and Justinian I.

In 1873 Godeshevo (Goudechevo) had male population of 76 Pomaks and 30 houses. According to Vasil Kanchov, in 1900 Godeshevo (Годешево) was populated by 650 Bulgarian Muslims According to another statistic by Kanchov about the same time there were 65 houses in the village. According to Stephan Verkovic at the end of the 19th century the village had male population of 96 Pomaks and 30 houses.

== Religions ==
The population is Muslim and consists of Pomaks.
