= Slashten =

Slashten Слащен
- Village
- Location of Slashten
- Coordinates: 41°30′N 24°1′E
- Country: Bulgaria
- Province (Oblast): Blagoevgrad
- Municipality (Obshtina): Satovcha

Government
  - Mayor: Dzheit Neizir (MRF)

Area
  - Total: 20.975 km^{2} (8.098 sq mi)
- Elevation: 679 m (2,228 ft)

Population (2010-12-15)
  - Total: 1,973
- Time zone: UTC+2 (EET)
  - Summer (DST): UTC+3 (EEST)
- Postal Code: 2937
- Area code: 07546
- Vehicle registration: E

Slashten (Bulgarian: Слащен) is a village in Southwestern Bulgaria. It is located in the Satovcha Municipality, Blagoevgrad Province.

== Geography ==
The village of Slashten is located in the Western Rhodope Mountains. It belongs to the Chech region.

== History ==
In 1873 Slashten (Slaschtene) had male population of 130 Pomaks and 50 houses. According to Vasil Kanchov, in 1900 Slashten was populated by 750 Bulgarian Muslims According to another statistic by Kanchov about the same time there were 90 houses in the village. There is a mosque.

== Religions ==
The population is Muslim and consists of Pomaks.

== Culture and Nature ==
The cave Stapalkite (The Steps) is 64 meters long with 38 meters denivelation (vertical rise).
