= Vaklinovo =

Vaklinovo Ваклиново
- Village
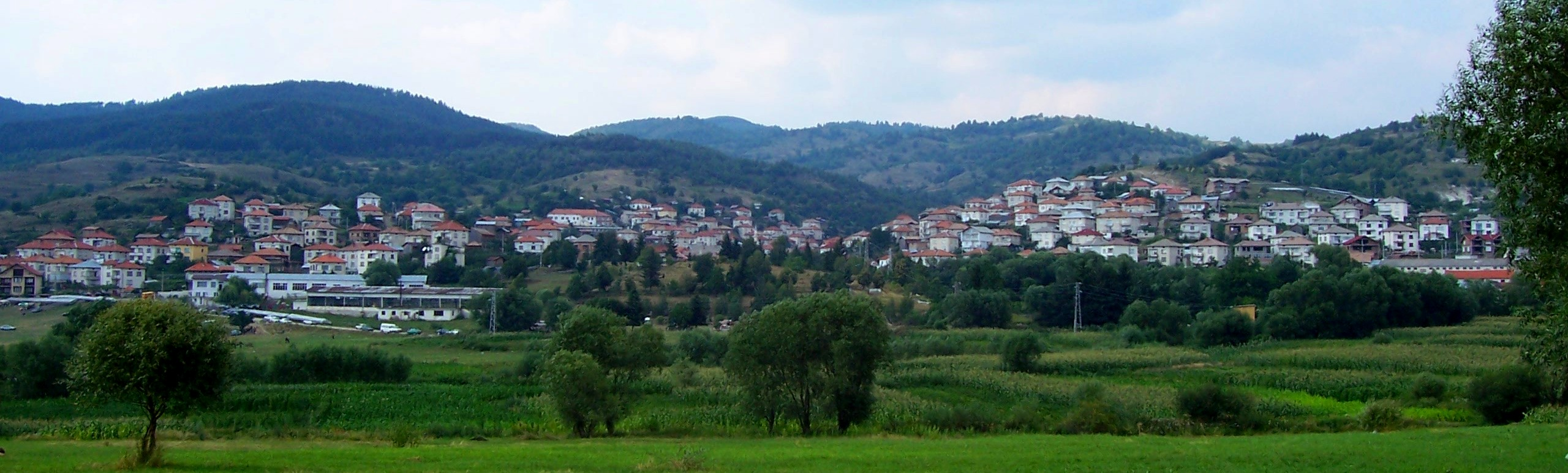

- Location of Vaklinovo
- Coordinates: 41°36′N 24°4′E
- Country: Bulgaria
- Province (Oblast): Blagoevgrad
- Municipality (Obshtina): Satovcha

Government
  - Mayor: Plamen Bratanov (MRF)

Area
  - Total: 13.522 km^{2} (5.221 sq mi)
- Elevation: 1,006 m (3,301 ft)

Population (2010-12-15)
  - Total: 1,132
- Time zone: UTC+2 (EET)
  - Summer (DST): UTC+3 (EEST)
- Postal Code: 2957
- Area code: 07545

Vaklinovo (Bulgarian: Ваклиново, until 1960 - Marulevo) is a village in Southwestern Bulgaria. It is located in the Satovcha Municipality, Blagoevgrad Province.

== Geography ==
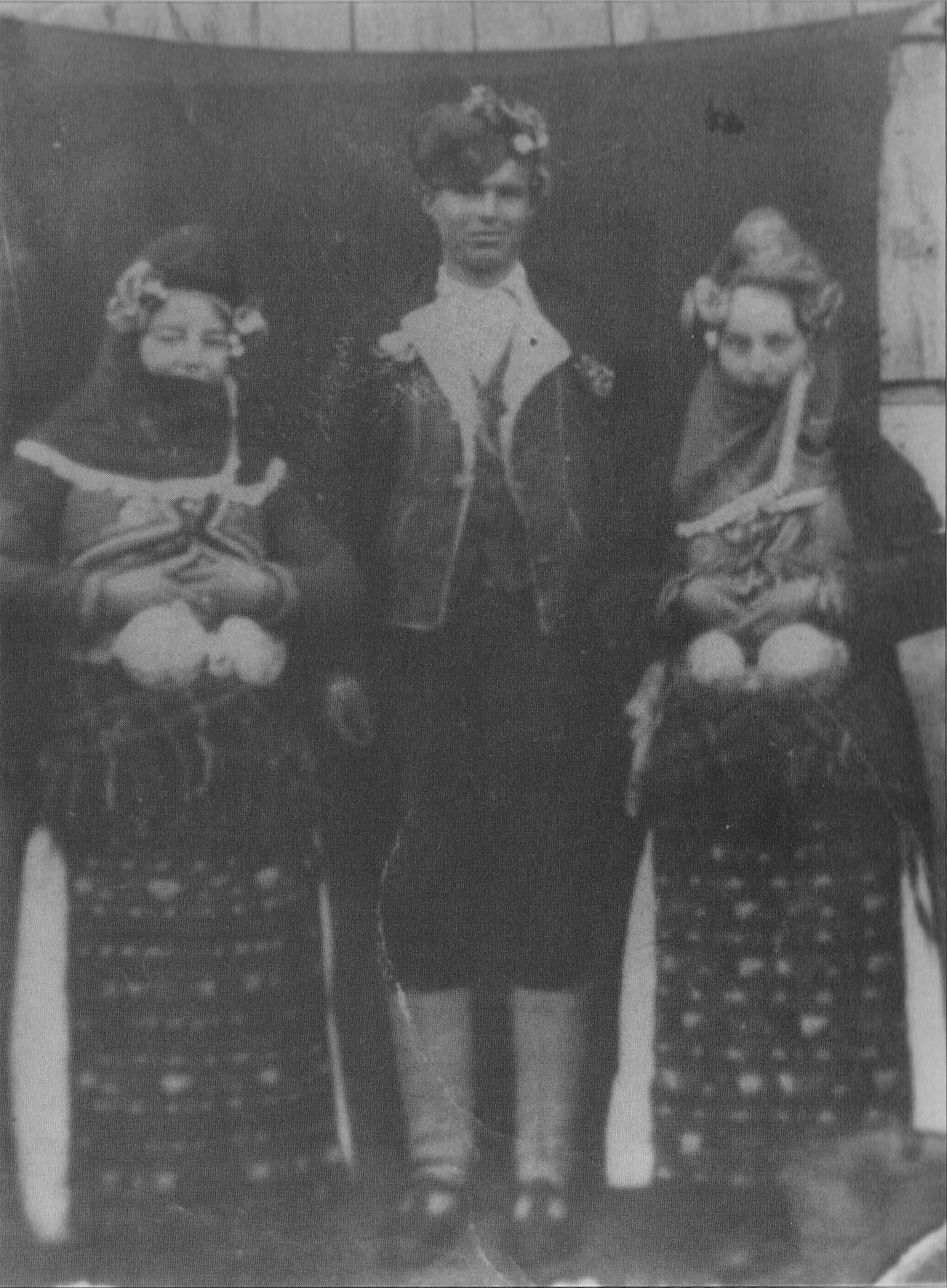
Bayram (Eid) in the village of Vaklinovo in the beginning of the 20th century.

The village of Vaklinovo is located in the Western Rhodope Mountains. It belongs to the Chech region.

== History ==
In 1873 Vaklinovo (Maroulévo) had male population of 175 Bulgarian Muslims and 63 houses. According to Vasil Kanchov, in 1900, Vaklinovo (Марулево) was populated by 300 Bulgarian Muslims According to another statistic by Kanchov about the same time there were 50 houses in the village. According to Stephan Verkovic at the end of the 19th century the village had male population of 208 Bulgarian Muslims and 63 houses.

== Religions ==
The population is Muslim and consists of Bulgarian Muslims.
