= Kribul =

Kribul Крибул
- Village
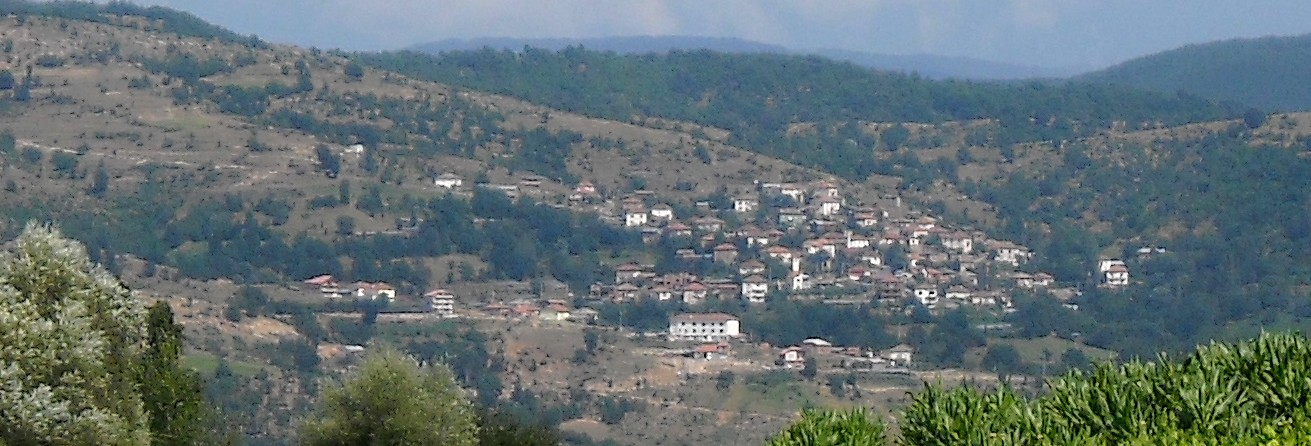

- Location of Kribul
- Coordinates: 41°34′N 23°56′E
- Country: Bulgaria
- Province (Oblast): Blagoevgrad
- Municipality (Obshtina): Satovcha

Government
  - Mayor: Ibrahim Shishkov (MRF)

Area
  - Total: 11.029 km^{2} (4.258 sq mi)
- Elevation: 825 m (2,707 ft)

Population (2010-12-15)
  - Total: 387
- Time zone: UTC+2 (EET)
  - Summer (DST): UTC+3 (EEST)
- Postal Code: 2951
- Area code: 07541
- Vehicle registration: E

Kribul (Bulgarian: Крибул, old version: Krabul) is a village in Southwestern Bulgaria. It is located in the Satovcha Municipality, Blagoevgrad Province.

Kribul Hill on Trinity Peninsula in Antarctica is named after the village.

== Geography ==
The village of Kribul is located in the Western Rhodope Mountains. It belongs to the Chech region.

== History ==
In the vicinity of Kribul after archeological research were found the remains of a late medieval church.

In 1873 Kribul (Kraboul) had male population of 140 Pomaks and 50 houses. According to Vasil Kanchov, in 1900, Kribul (Крабулъ) was populated by 550 Bulgarian Muslims According to Stefan Verković at the end of the 19th century the village had male population of 180 Pomaks and 50 houses.

== Religions ==
The population is Muslim.
