= Valkosel =

Valkosel Вълкосел
- Village
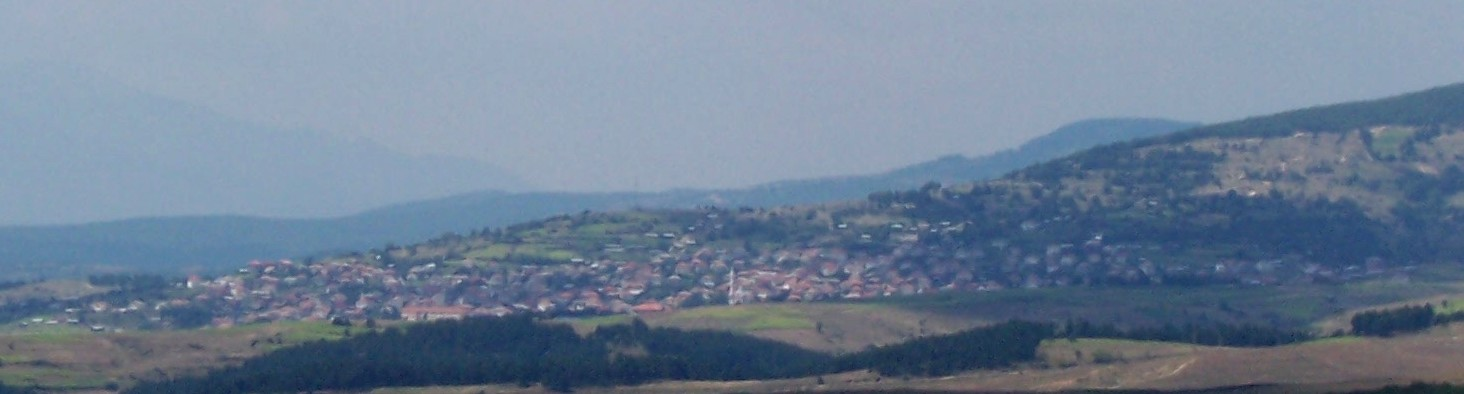

- Location of Valkosel
- Coordinates: 41°32′N 23°59′E
- Country: Bulgaria
- Province (Oblast): Blagoevgrad
- Municipality (Obshtina): Satovcha

Government
  - Mayor: Ramiz Biljukov (MRF)

Area
  - Total: 29.506 km^{2} (11.392 sq mi)
- Elevation: 783 m (2,569 ft)

Population (2010-12-15)
  - Total: 2,476
- Time zone: UTC+2 (EET)
  - Summer (DST): UTC+3 (EEST)
- Postal Code: 2930
- Area code: 07547
- Vehicle registration: E

Valkosel (Bulgarian: Вълкосел [vɐɫkoˈsɛɫ]) is a village in Southwestern Bulgaria. It is located in the Satovcha Municipality, Blagoevgrad Province.

== Geography ==
The village of Valkosel is located in the Western Rhodope Mountains. It belongs to the Chech region.

== History ==
According to Vasil Kanchov, in 1900 Valkosel was populated by 800 Bulgarian Muslims.

== Religions ==
The population is Muslim.

== Honour ==
Valkosel Ridge in Antarctica is named after the village.
