= Tuhovishta =

Village in Bulgaria

Tuhovishta Туховища
- Village
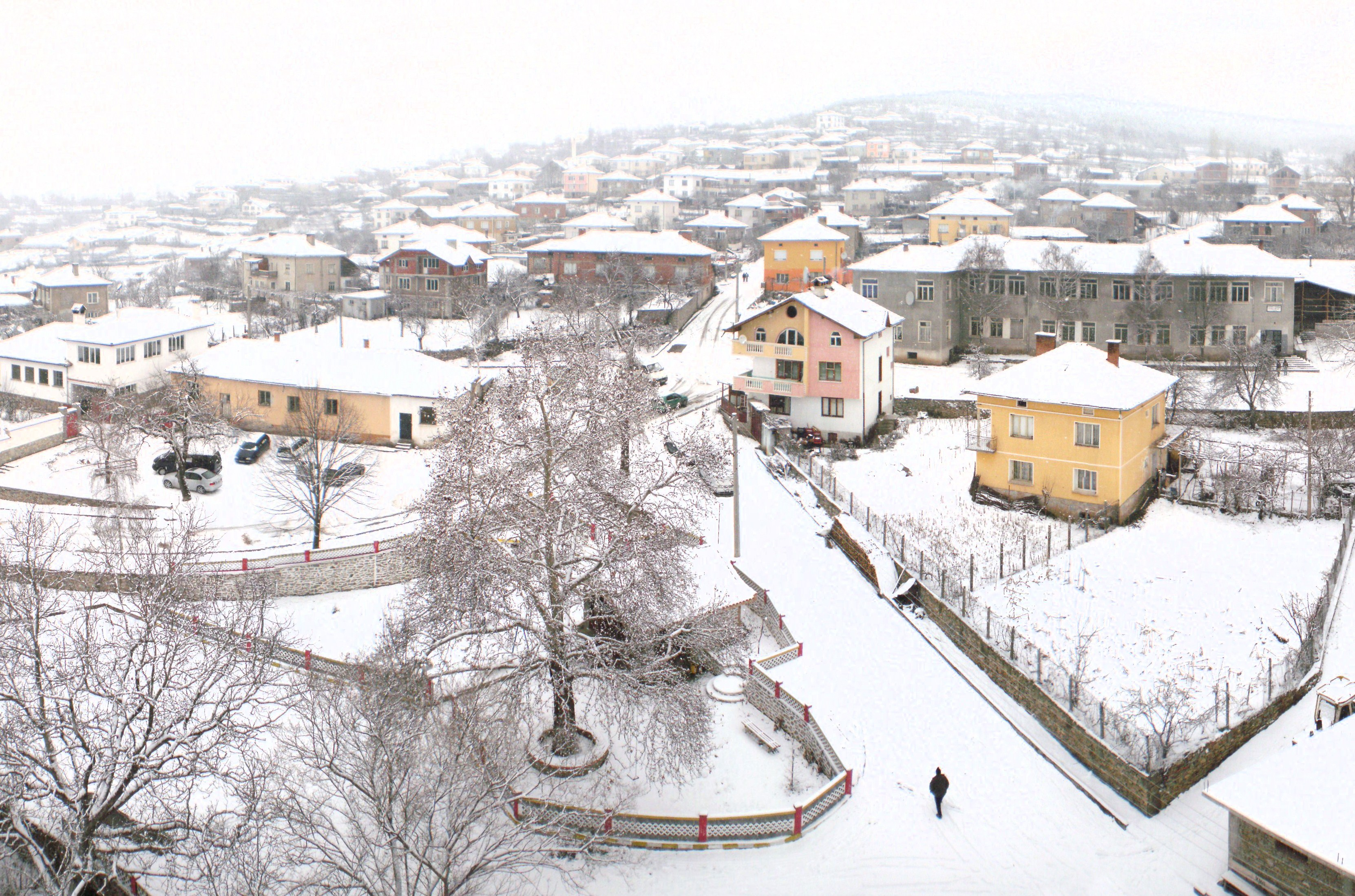

- Location of Tuhovishta
- Coordinates: 41°30′N 24°3′E
- Country: Bulgaria
- Province (Oblast): Blagoevgrad
- Municipality (Obshtina): Satovcha

Government
  - Mayor: Shukri Shukriev (CEDB)

Area
  - Total: 17.151 km^{2} (6.622 sq mi)
- Elevation: 836 m (2,743 ft)

Population (2010-12-15)
  - Total: 815
- Time zone: UTC+2 (EET)
  - Summer (DST): UTC+3 (EEST)
- Postal Code: 2939
- Area code: 07548
- Vehicle registration: E

Tuhovishta (variation of the name Tuvishta or Duhovishta) is a village in Southwest Bulgaria, part of Satovcha Municipality, Blagoevgrad Province.

== Geography ==
Tuhovishta is located in the southwestern Rhodope Mountains and is part of the historical and geographical area Chech. t is located about 2 kilometers from the border with Greece. Altitude of the village is 700–999 meters and the area of the land is 17.15 km^{2}. The village adjoins the lands of the following villages: in the east with Greece's border, with the lands of depopulated villages of Boren and Manastir, in the west with the lands of Slashten and Valkosel, in the south with the land of Godeshevo and in the North with Zhizhevo's land. The village is located 20 km south of Satovcha.

=== Relief ===
Tuhovishta is located in the Dabrash's hill, so the relief is mainly mountainous and hilly, which passes in the high parts in hilly or mountainous hilly and in places is very rugged. From a geological point of view the land is presented basically from rocks, granite, rhyolite and sandstone. Brown forest and sandy-clay soils dominate the land. Overall, the relief is extremely varied. The village is situated at the crossroads between several small hills. In a flat lands, rocks, naked peaks and valley riverfront. Over Tuhovishta are two of the highest peaks in the region - Chukata (local name - Mitnitsata) in the northeast at an altitude of 1010 m and the highest peak in the region Dikilitash Peak, better known as "Pobit Kamen", with a height of 1100 m. Peak Pobit Kamen is located between Tuhovishta and Valkosel. In late autumn and late spring, when over the village and the surrounding falls frost but over Pobit Kamen precipitations are of snow.

=== Climate ===
The climate is moderate continental (subtropical) with particular influence in the high mountain areas (Chukata and Dikilitash). Average annual temperature is 10 °C. The average January temperature is moving according to altitude between 0 °C to 7 °C. Summer is warm and sunny. The average annual maximum temperature in the valley of the Mesta river is 32-36 °C, but in the mid-part 23-32 °C. Predominates the autumn-winter and spring-summer rainfalls. Seasons are distinct - summer hot and winter - moderately cold.

=== Flora and fauna ===
Forests are rich in coniferous and deciduous species - pine, spruce, beech, fir, oak, birch, willow and others. Since Tuhovishta is in a transition from hilly to mountainous area it can be noted that the coniferous, wood or bush vegetation exceeds the deciduous vegetation several times. Of species it can be mentioned bear, hare, wolf, fox, marten, deer, wild boar and many others. Common in summer are snakes and adders, in shady places vipers, other reptiles are lizards, salamander, and many others.

Hydrographic network includes the Mesta River, Dospat and many smaller rivers and springs. There are many micro-dams used for irrigation, fishing and more.

== History ==
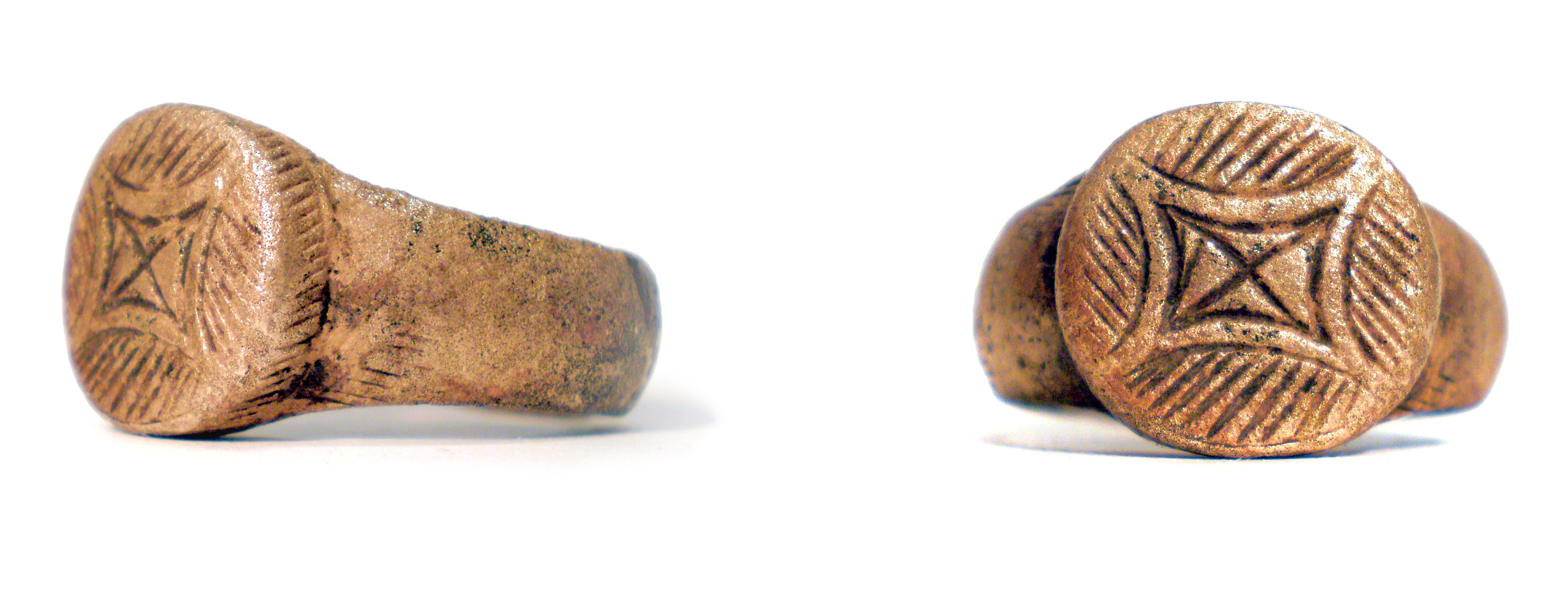
Roman bronze ring found in Tuhovishta

The village has an outdoor medieval necropolis.

In Ottoman Documents the village is mentioned as Thuishta (in Ottoman Turkish: تحويشته).

The population of the village is Muslim and since 19th century Tuhovishta is a Muslim village in Nevrokopian territory of the Ottoman Empire.

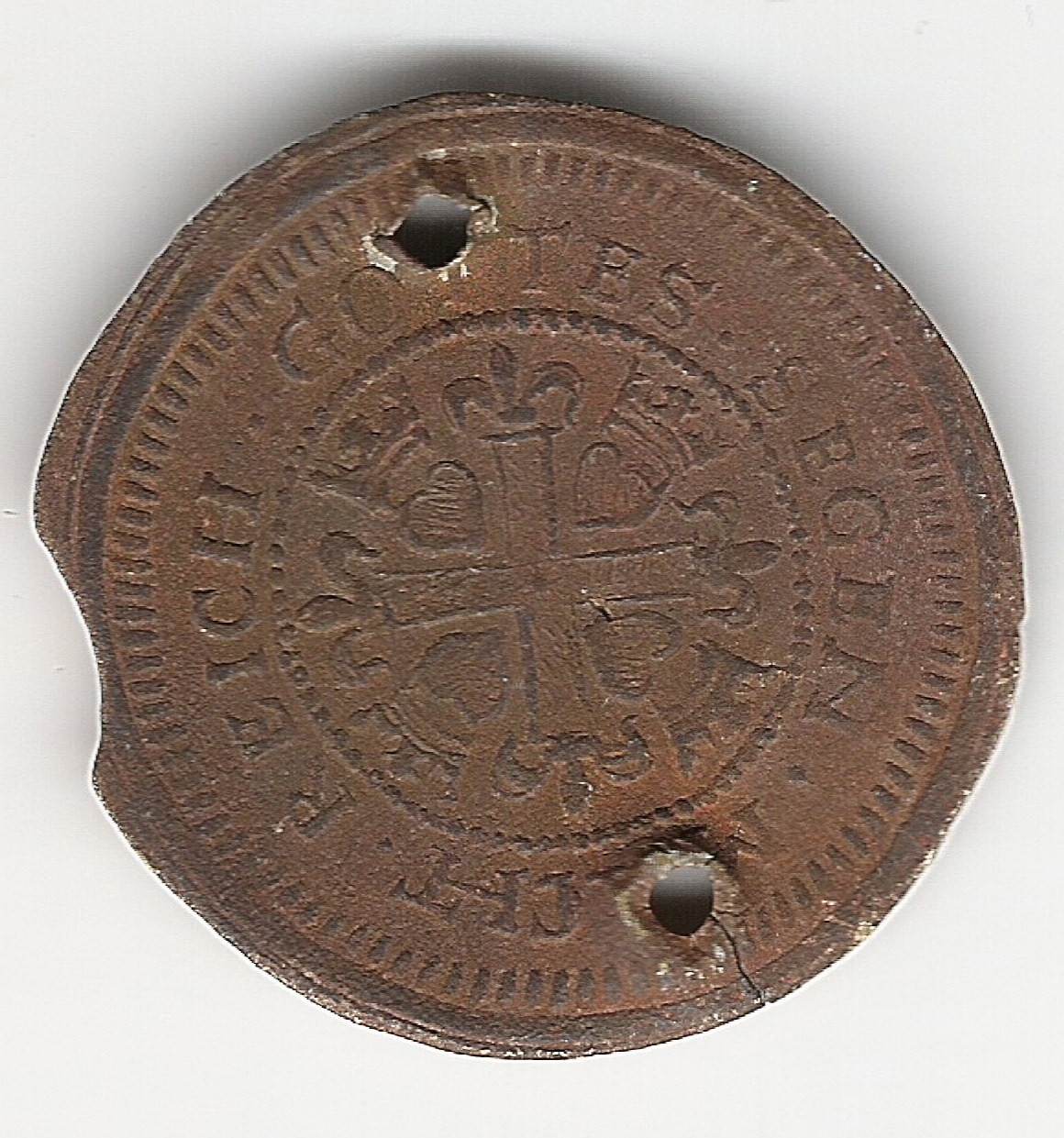
Token found in Tuhovishta of the 17th - 18th century for accounting purposes. The master who made the token was called Wolf Lauffer

In "Ethnography of vilayets Adrianople, Monastir and Salonika", published in Constantinople in 1878 and reflecting statistics of the male population since 1873, Tuhovishta is listed as a village with 36 households and 90 inhabitants Muslims.

According to Stephen Verkovich at the end of 19th century Tuhovishta has a Muslim male population of 120 people living in 36 houses.

According to Vasil Kanchov's statistics to 1900 Tuhovishta is a Bulgarian-Moslem village. There live 500 Bulgarians-Muslims in 70 houses.

In 1912, during the Balkan war, Tuhovishta is a victim of the Christianization of the Muslims. Plovdiv's church wants to Christianize Muslims and local rebels burn Tuhovishta along with other villages while the population hides along the river and the big hills.

In 1949, the village enters into the composition of the Municipality of Slashten under Decree 794 of the Presidium of the National Assembly of 24 September 1949. By decision of the Blagoevgrad District People's Council of 28 November 1958 Tuhovishta goes to the Satovcha Municipality. It is returned to the Municipality of Slashten by decree 959 of the Presidium of the National Assembly of 23 December 1965. Pursuant to Decree 2295 of the State Council of People's Republic of 22 December 1978 it was again transferred to the Municipality of Satovcha.

In 1970, the villagers are victims of to the Bulgarisation process.

During the Bulgarisation over population was exerted systematic harassment, which included banning the execution of any Muslim rites - a visit to the mosque, wearing headscarves, trousers, breeches, a Muslim burial custom, etc. Turkish names of residents were forcibly changed to Bulgarian. Many villagers find their death around the Bulgarian-Greek border in an attempt to emigrate illegally. Frequent is killing people around the border to intimidate the population. In 1989, the population gets back their Muslim names.

Population of Tuhovishta according to the census in 2003 was 859 people and puts it in eighth place in number of inhabitants of the fourteen villages comprising the Satovcha Municipality. The same place gets for its territory, this is 17,01 km^{2} which is 5.11% of the terrain of the Satovcha Municipality.

== Religion ==
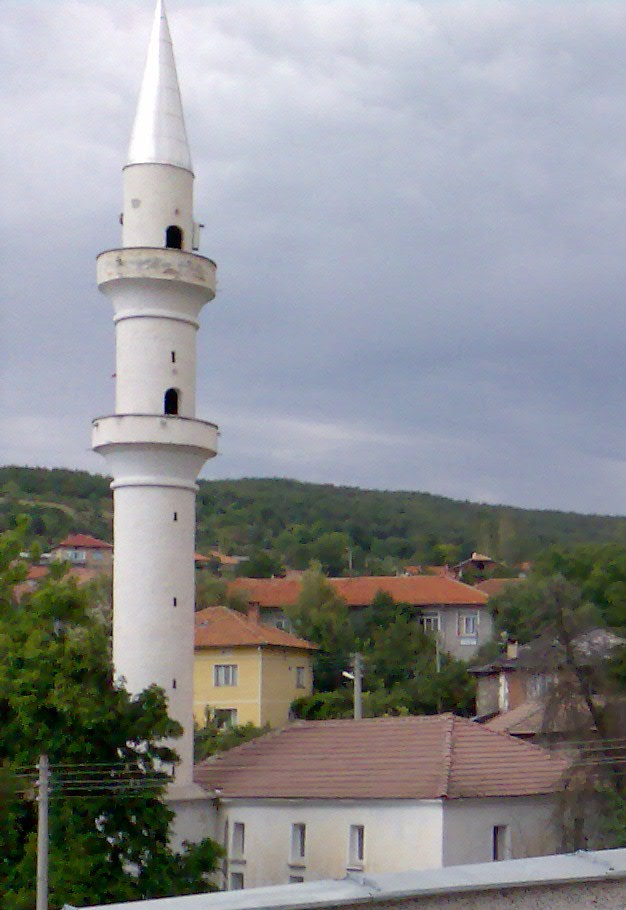
The mosque in Tuhovishta

Currently the village has over 830 Tuhovishta inhabitants Bulgarian Muslims (Pomaks). The village has two mosques - one in the bottom quarter which has one minaret with two balconies, built in 1989 under the leadership of Mustafa Shukriev building techniques and masters Zeinil Kalarev, Aliosman Yumer, Yusuf Bashov and voluntary financial support of the whole village. The mosque in the bottom quarter is refreshed - repairs were made in 2000 by businessman Shukri Shukriev. The second mosque, which is older, is located in the upper quarter and there is only one balcony.

== Sport ==
"Granichar" - Tuhovishta was registered in 1976 and created by the idea of local residents such as Mizamidin Sinanov who is also the first coach of the team, Gosho Temendzhiyski, a teacher from the town of Gotse Delchev, Valkov, head of the outpost, who helps to make the playground, Stoicho Gabrovski, teacher from Dupnitsa and many others. Team's name "Granichar" is inherited from the cultural center in the village, which is also called "Granichar".

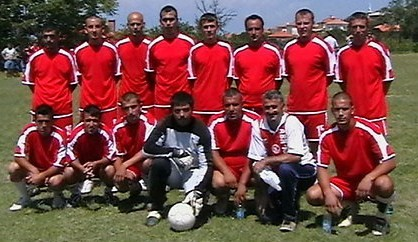
Team "Granichar" - Tuhovishta

Before Tuhovishta had an official team, the best players were taken in the neighbor villages, such as Slashten and Valkosel, where they were trained and now are at the base of Granichar. In the early years, teams of soldiers from the outpost played in the team. The strongest moment of the team was in the early 80s. Only 5 years after its creation, the team quickly rose to top positions, thanks to teachers, soldiers and residents of the village, players in the team. Some of the first players were Ahmed Kyoibashiev, Bekir Bekirov, Aliosman Kotelov, Mehmed Kyoibashiev and others.

In 2000, the team ceases to exist due to financial reasons. In 2009 the team was registered again by the initiative of local residents and sponsoring of the Tuhovishtan immigrant Mehmed Kasapov.

The team's president up today is Emin Mustafov Yumerov.

First Chamber of "Granichar" - Tuhovishta

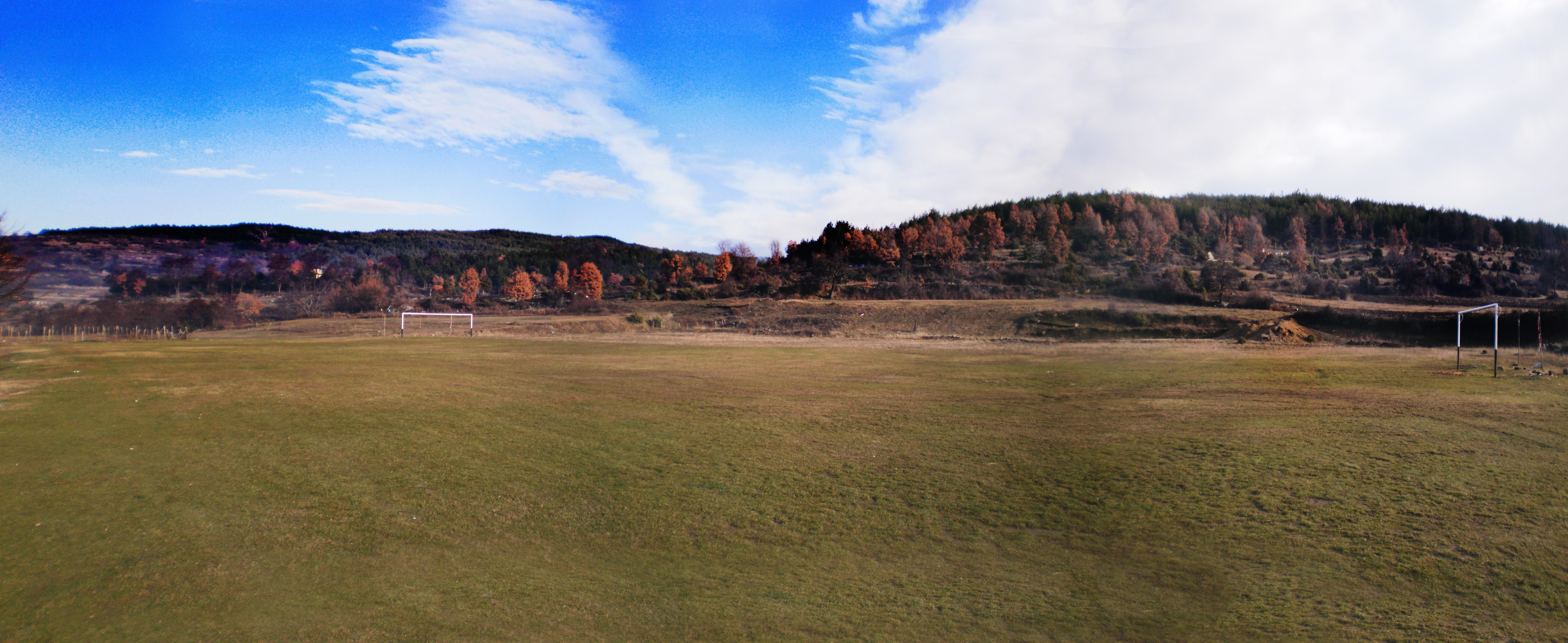
Panoramic view of the Tuhovishta's football team playground

- Sinanov
- Tsvetanov
- Ichev
- Andonov
- Zivko Yovchev
- Mehmed Kyoybashiev
- Ali Halimov
- Bekir Bekirov
- Stoicho Gabrovski
- Gosho Temendzhiyski
- Dzhemisap Topalov
- Ali Dangov
- Mehmed Imamov
- Jamal Chaushev
- Aliosman Kotelov

== Gallery ==
Pictures from Tuhovishta

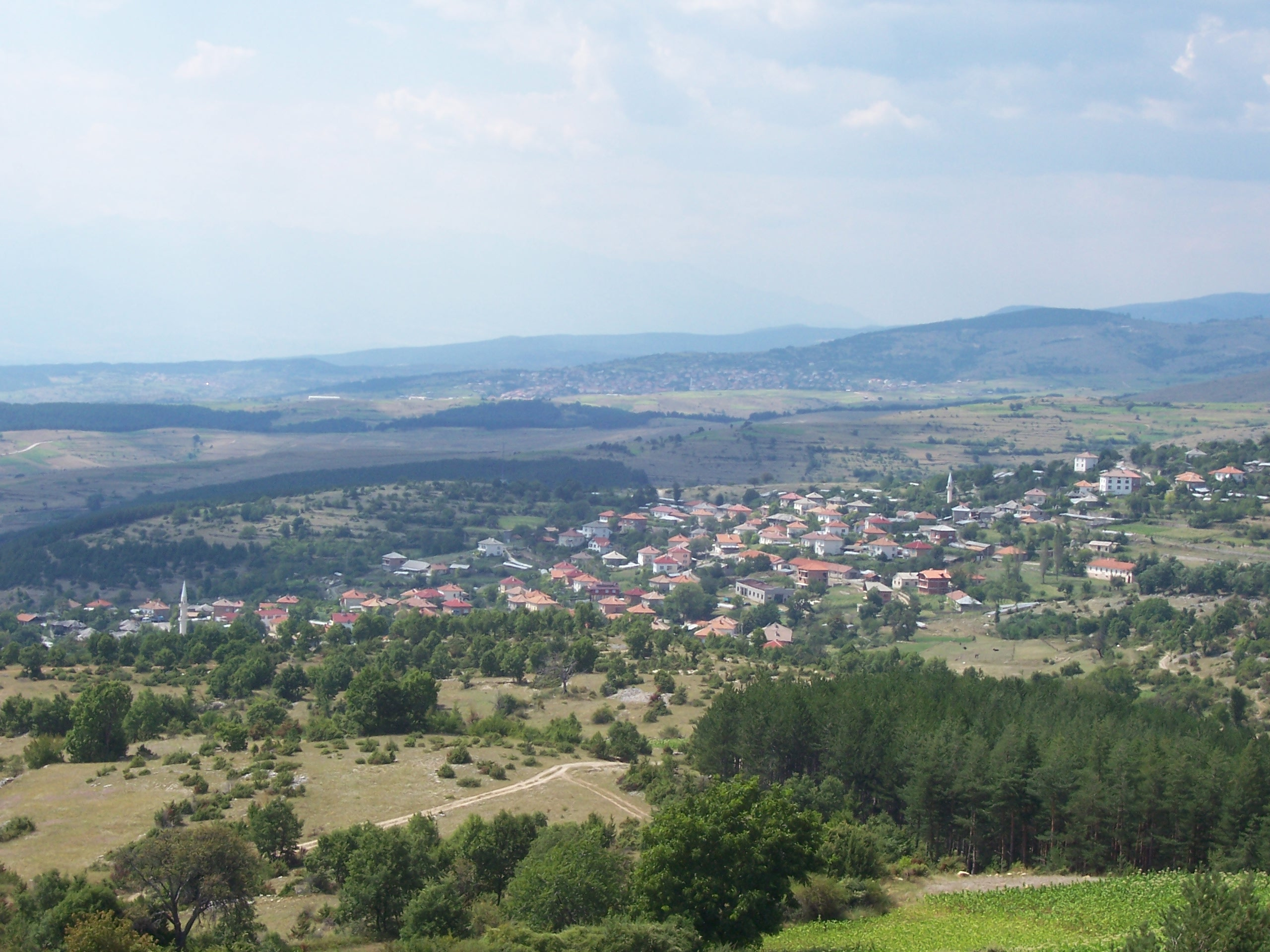
View of Tuhovishta

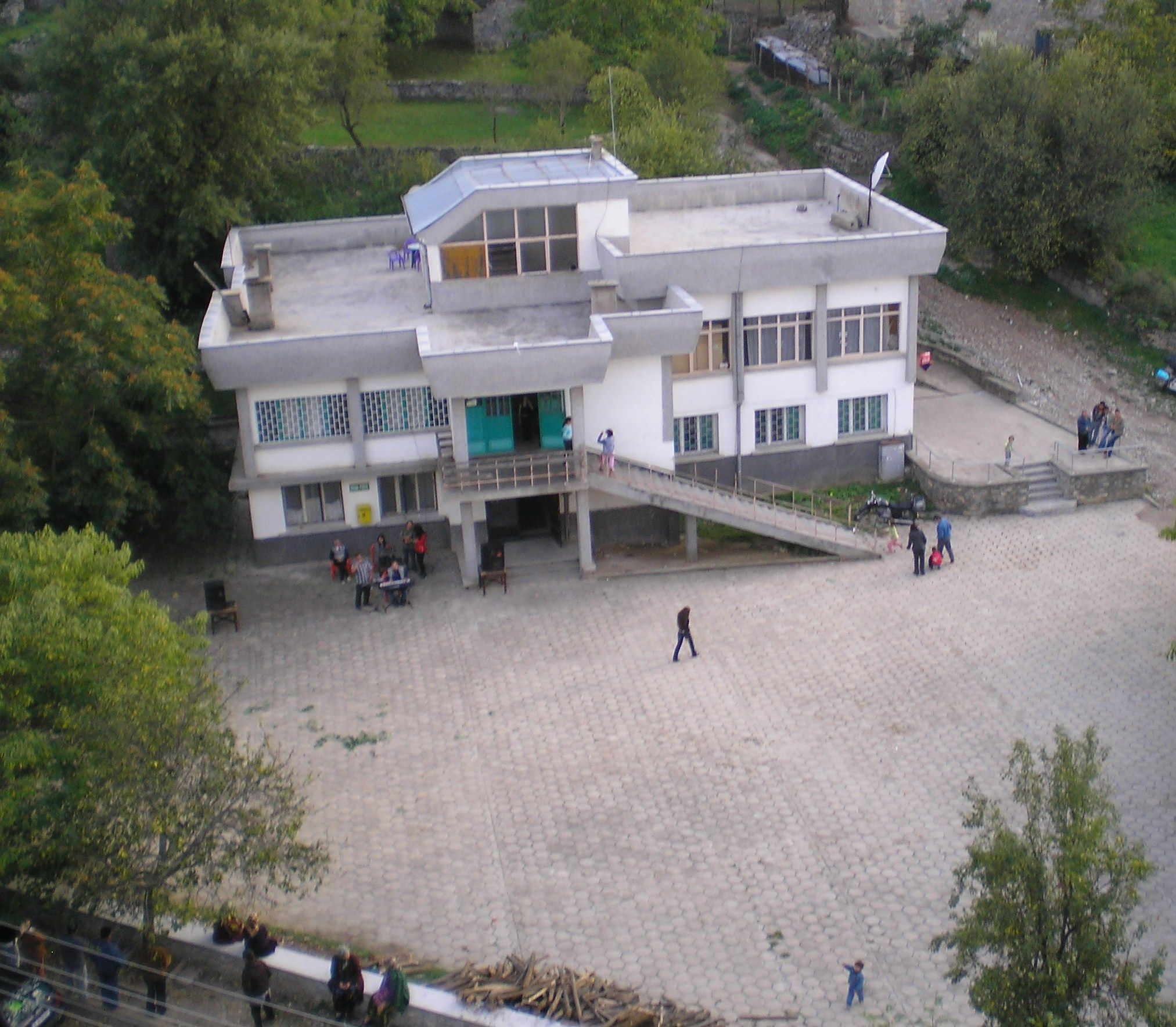
Tuhovishta square

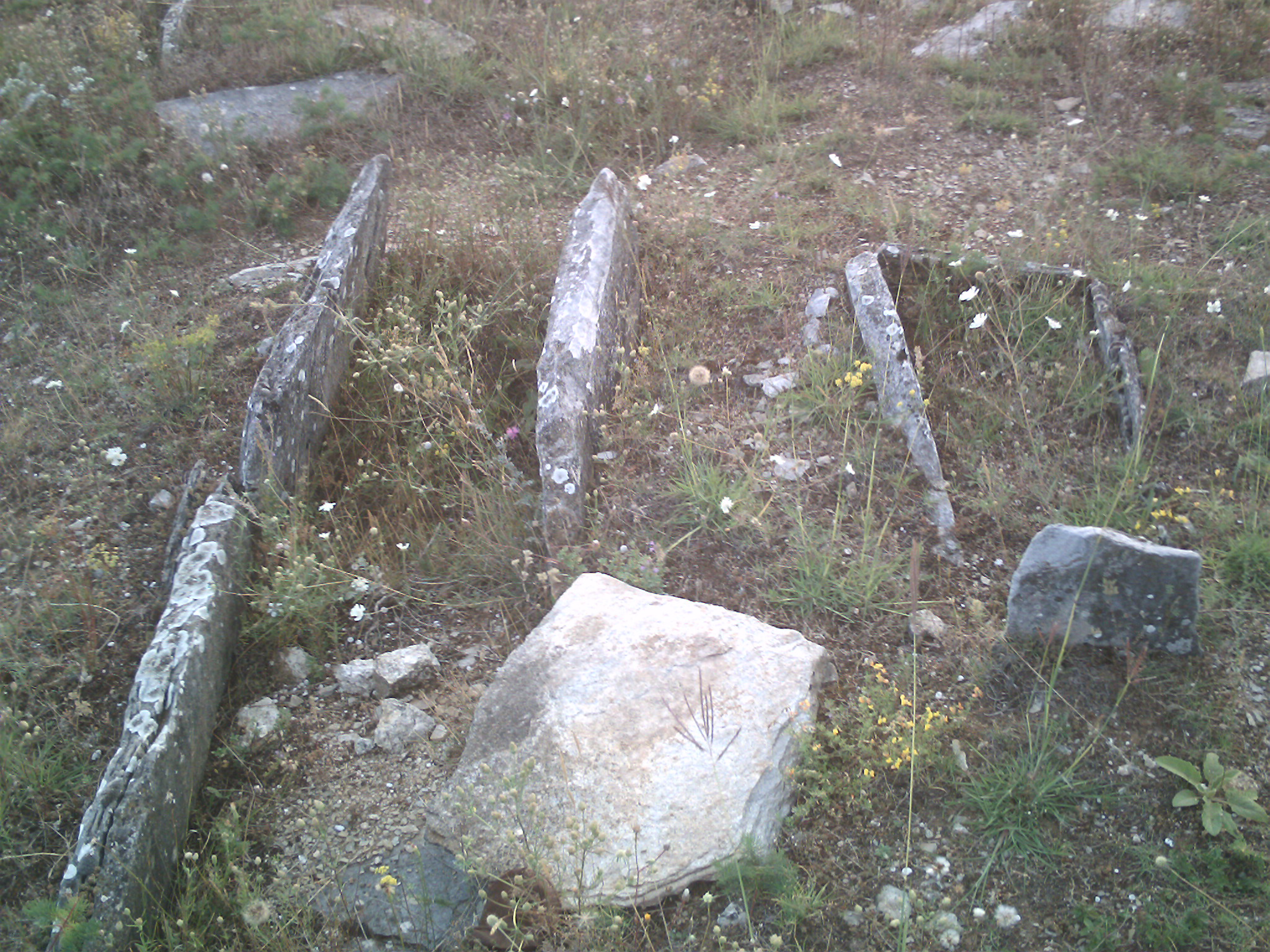
Tombs in Tuhovishta's Necropolis

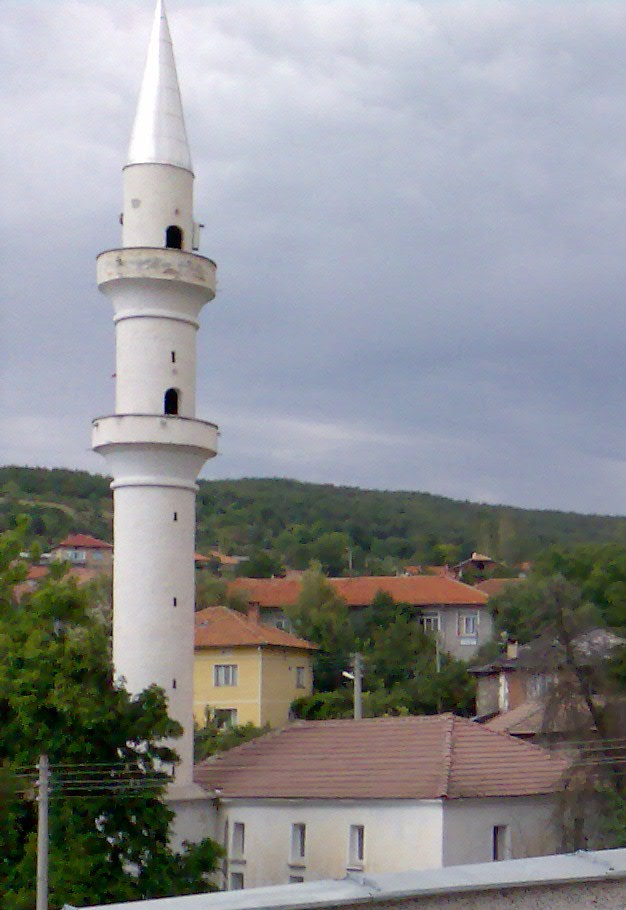
Mosque in the center

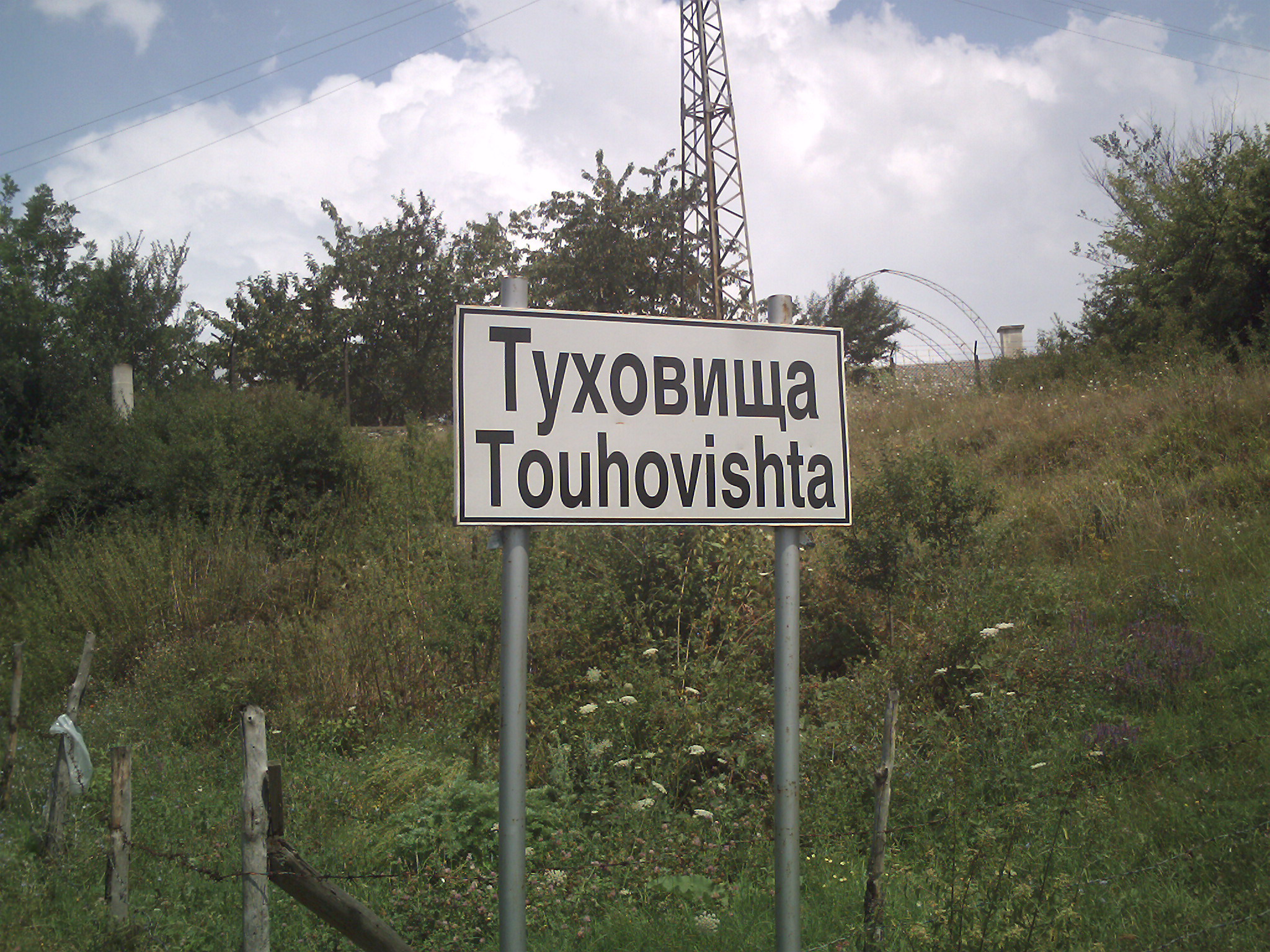
Plate
