= Satovcha Municipality =

Coordinates: 41°37′N 23°58′E

Satovcha Municipality Община Сатовча
- Municipality
- Coat of arms

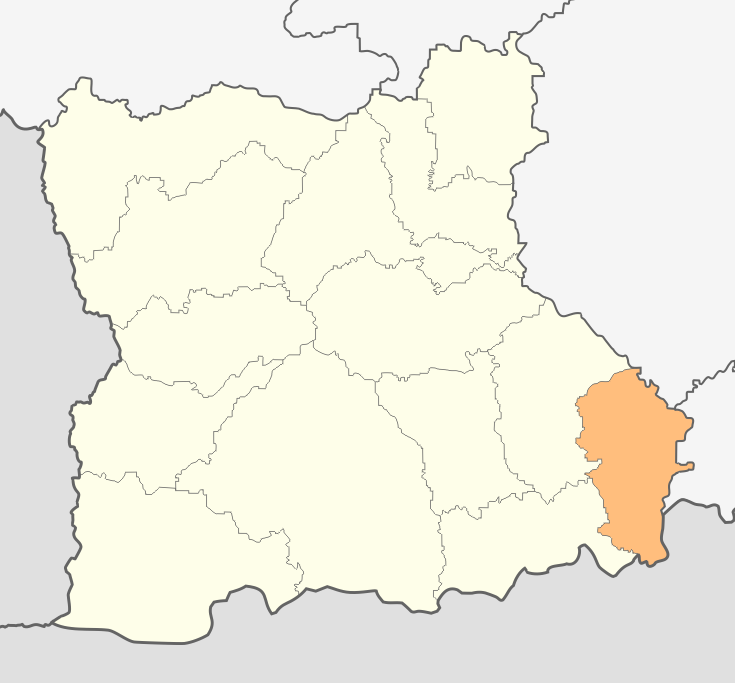
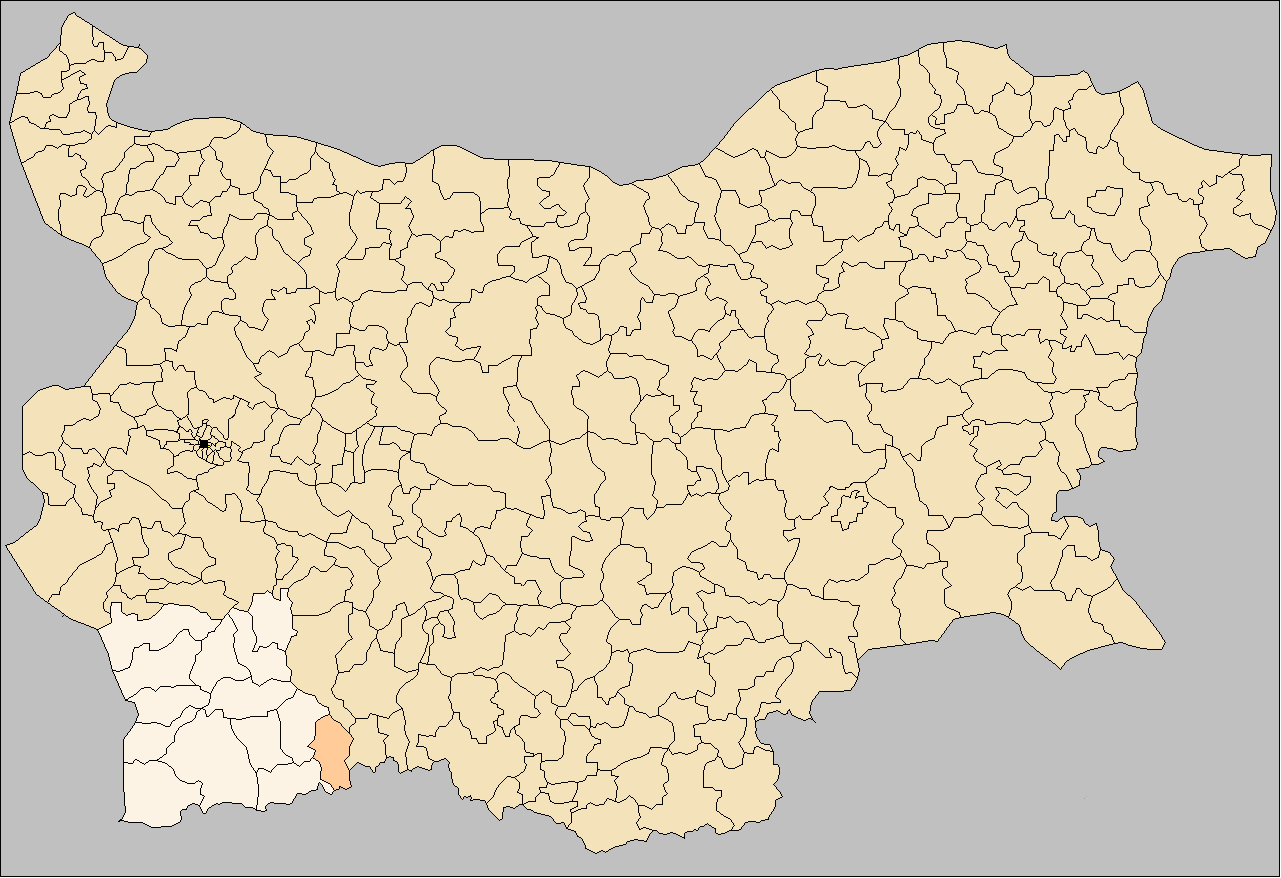
- Location in Blagoevgrad province Location on map of Bulgaria
- Country: Bulgaria
- Province (Oblast): Blagoevgrad

Area
  - Total: 332.59 km^{2} (128.41 sq mi)

Population
  - Total: 16,003
  - Density: 48.116/km^{2} (124.62/sq mi)

Satovcha Municipality is a municipality in southwestern Bulgaria and is one of the municipalities in the Blagoevgrad Province.

== Geography ==
It covers the Southwestern Rhodope Mountains. 14 settlemements belong to the municipality with a total of 18,997 inhabitants (21.07.05) and a territory of 334,245 km^{2}. Administrative, industrial and cultural center of the municipality is the village of Satovcha.

== Population ==
As of December 2018, there are 14,263 inhabitants living in the municipality of Satovcha, down from 18,265 inhabitants in 2000. The municipality of Satovcha has a Muslim majority (over 85% of the total population). Nearly all of them are Bulgarian Muslims (on the contrary, most Muslims in Bulgaria are ethnic Turks).

	Population	Live births	Deaths	Natural growth	Birth rate (‰)	Death rate (‰)	Natural growth rate (‰)
2000	18,265	204	130	74	11.2	7.1	4.1
2001	17,770	146	156	-10	8.2	8.8	-0.6
2002	17,635	186	121	65	10.5	6.9	3.7
2003	17,576	185	142	43	10.5	8.1	2.4
2004	17,501	188	122	66	10.7	7.0	3.8
2005	17,428	181	148	33	10.4	8.5	1.9
2006	17,318	178	156	22	10.3	9.0	1.3
2007	17,269	192	158	34	11.1	9.1	2.0
2008	17,264	216	157	59	12.5	9.1	3.4
2009	17,152	168	154	14	9.8	9.0	0.8
2010	17,009	140	143	-3	8.2	8.4	-0.2
2011	15,290	135	167	-32	8.8	10.9	-2.1
2012	15,138	121	145	-24	8.0	9.6	-1.6
2013	14,970	117	169	-52	7.8	11.3	-3.5
2014	14,829	138	157	-19	9.3	10.6	-1.3
2015	14,681	121	141	-20	8.2	9.6	-1.4
2016	14,498	121	142	-21	8.3	9.8	-1.4
2017	14,353	93	163	-70	6.5	11.4	-4.9
2018	14,263	87	166	-79	6.1	11.6	-5.5

Satovcha has a declining birth rate as young women are moving out of the villages.

=== Religion ===
According to the latest Bulgarian census of 2011, the religious composition, among those who answered the optional question on religious identification, was the following:

Religious composition of Satovcha Municipality
Orthodox Christianity	8.95%
Catholicism	0.00%
Protestantism	0.19%
Islam	85.91%
No religion	0.71%
Prefer not to answer, others and aindefinable	4.24%

== Settlements in the municipality ==
- Bogolin
- Dolen
- Fargovo
- Godeshevo
- Kochan
- Kribul
- Osina
- Pletena
- Satovcha
- Slashten
- Tuhovishta
- Vaklinovo
- Valkosel
- Zhizhevo
