= Pomaks =

Bulgarian-speaking Muslims

Помаци (Bulgarian and Macedonian); Πομάκοι (Greek); Pomaklar (Turkish)
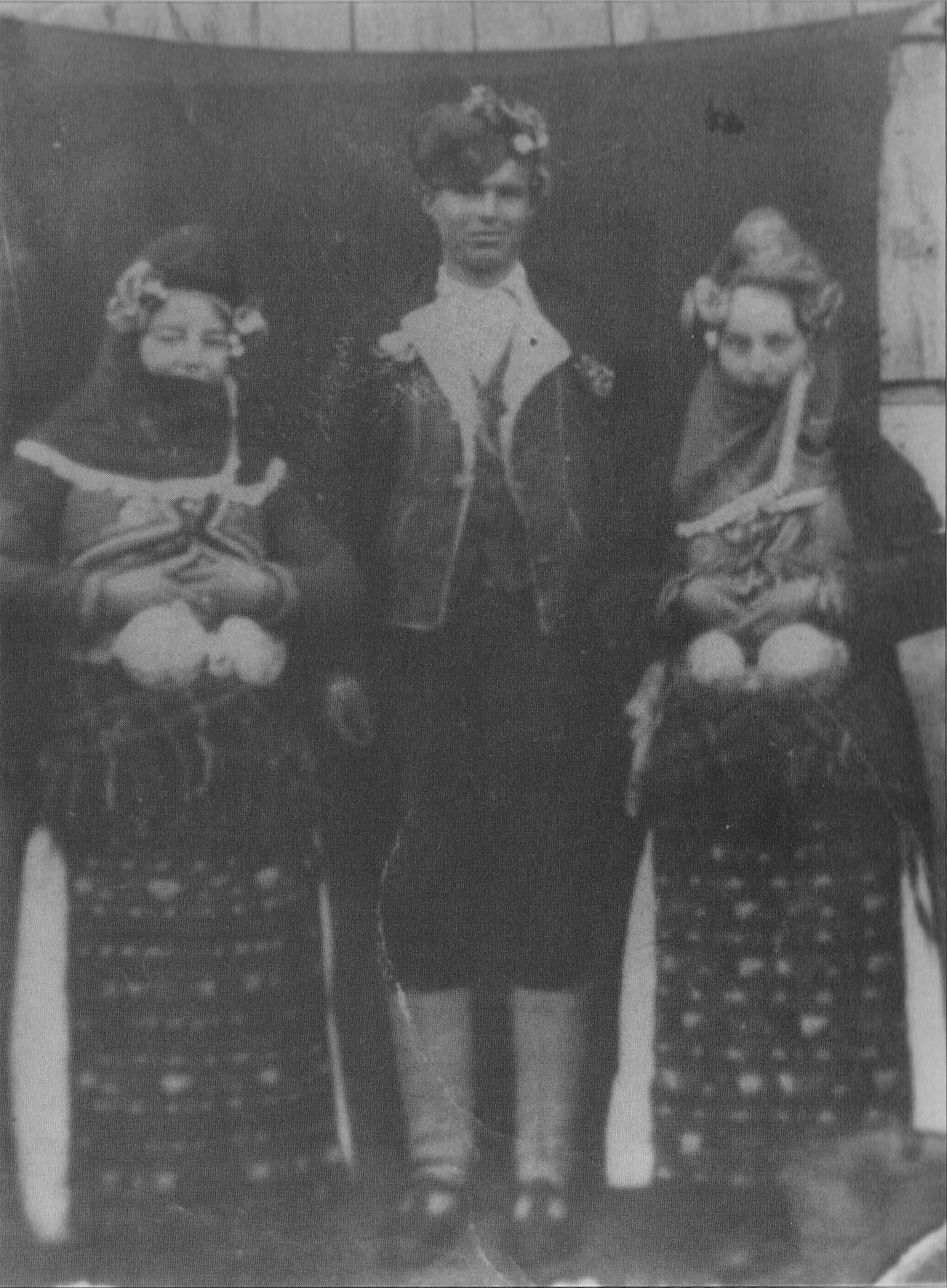
- Pomaks in the early 20th century

Total population
- c. 1 million

Regions with significant populations
- Turkey: 350,000- 600,000
- Bulgaria: 107,777 (2021 Census) 67,350 Muslim Bulgarians (2011 census) up to 250,000
- Greece: 50,000 in Western Thrace

Languages
- Bulgarian (native), Greek (by those residing in Greece) and Turkish (by those residing in Turkey) (Note: Pomaks are speakers of various Bulgarian dialects as their native language.)

Religion
- Sunni Islam

Related ethnic groups
- Bulgarians, Bosniaks, Gorani, Torbeši

Pomaks (Note: Bulgarian: Помаци, romanized: Pomatsi; Macedonian: Помаци; Greek: Πομάκοι, romanized: Pomáki; Turkish: Pomaklar) are Bulgarian-speaking Muslims inhabiting Bulgaria, northwestern Turkey, and northeastern Greece. The c. 220,000 strong ethno-confessional minority in Bulgaria is recognized officially as Bulgarian Muslims by the government. The term has also been used as a wider designation, including also the Slavic Muslim populations of North Macedonia and Albania. Most Pomaks today live in Turkey, where they have settled as muhacirs as a result of escaping previous ethnic cleansing in Bulgaria.

Bulgaria recognizes their language as a Bulgarian dialect, whereas in Greece and Turkey they self-declare their language as the Pomak language. The community in Greece is commonly fluent in Greek, and in Turkey, Turkish, while the communities in these two countries, especially in Turkey, are increasingly adopting Turkish as their first language as a result of education and family links with the Turkish people.

They are not officially recognized as one people with the ethnonym of Pomaks. The term is widely used colloquially for Eastern South Slavic Muslims, considered derogatory. However, in Greece and Turkey the practice for declaring the ethnic group at census has been abolished for decades. Different members of the group today declare a variety of ethnic identities: Bulgarian, Pomak, ethnic Muslims, Turkish and other.

== Etymology ==
The name "Pomak" first appeared in the Bulgarian Christian-heretical language surroundings of Northern Bulgaria (the regions of Loveč, Teteven, Lukovit, Bjala Slatina). An older etymology relates it to the dialectical words помáкан, помáчен (pomákan, pomáčen), meaning "tormented, tortured." This etymology has been contested, for having historically dubious sources. Other etymologies relate it to помъкна се (pomákna se), meaning "to haul", помамя (pomamya), meaning "to cheat", помагам (pomagam), meaning "to help" (historically, the Ottomans), or *по-мохамед-ов-ак (pomohamedovak), meaning somebody who has converted to Muhammad or Islam.

== Origins ==
Their precise origin has been interpreted differently by Bulgarian, Greek and Turkish historians, but it is generally considered they are descendants of native Eastern Orthodox Bulgarians, and Paulicians who also previously converted to Orthodoxy and Catholicism, who converted to Islam during the Ottoman rule of the Balkans. Information through Ottoman and Catholic missionaries reports supports this theory.

=== Genetic studies ===
A specific DNA mutation, HbO, which emerged about 2,000 years ago on a rare haplotype is characteristic of the Greek Pomaks. Its frequency increased as a consequence of high genetic drift within this population. This indicates that the Greek Pomaks are an isolated population with limited contacts with their neighbours. A 2014 study also confirmed high homozygosity and according to MDS analysis the Greek Pomaks cluster among European populations, near the general Greek population.

== History ==
Pomaks are today usually considered descendants of native Orthodox Bulgarians and Paulicians who converted to Islam during the Ottoman rule of the Balkans. They started to become Muslim gradually, from the Ottoman occupation (early 15th century) to the end of the 18th century. Subsequently, these people became part of the Muslim community of the millet system. At that time people were bound to their millets by their religious affiliations (or their confessional communities), rather than their ethnic origins, according to the millet concept.

A monk Pachomios Roussanos (1508–1553), who visited the mountain area of Xanthi, mentioned that around 1550 only six or nine villages had turned to Islam. Furthermore the documents show that not only had Islam spread to the area at that time, but that the Pomaks had participated in Ottoman military operations voluntarily as is the case with the village of Shahin (Echinos).

In North Central Bulgaria (the regions of Lovech, Teteven, Lukovit, Byala Slatina) the Ottoman authorities requested in 1689, after the Chiprovtsi Uprising, for military reasons Bulgarian Paulicians (heterodox Christian sect) to convert to one of the officially recognized religions in the Ottoman Empire. One part of them became the Bulgarian-Christians by converting to Ottoman recognized Christian denominations, either the Eastern Orthodox Christian Church or the Catholic Church, while the other part converted to Islam and began to be called Pomaks. So, in North Central Bulgaria Pomaks became those of Bulgarian Christian heretics, for which it was unacceptable or impossible to convert to the Eastern Orthodox Christian because of dogmatic, economic, family or other reasons.

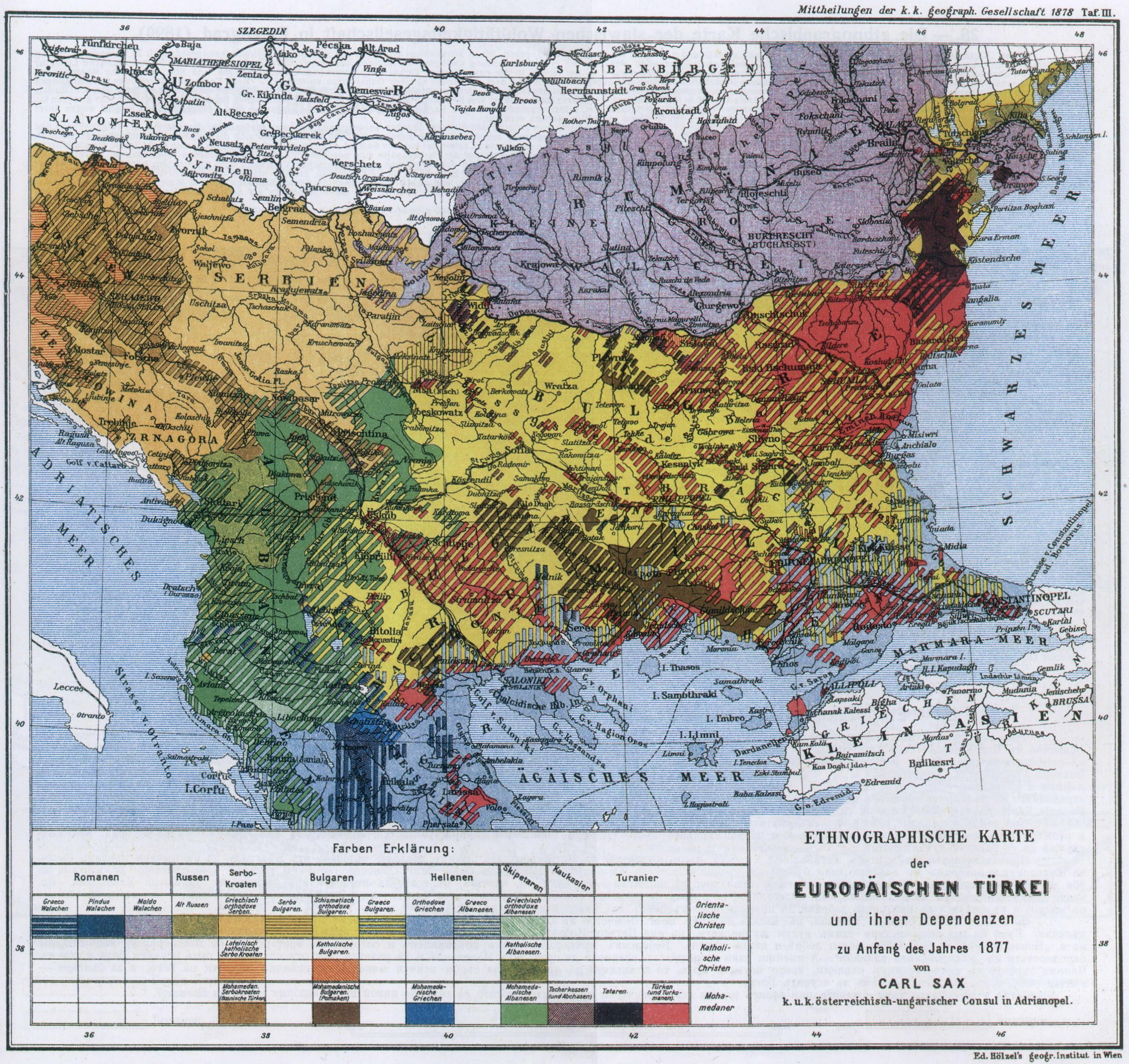
Ethnographic map of European Turkey from the late 19th century, showing the regions largely populated by Pomaks in brown.

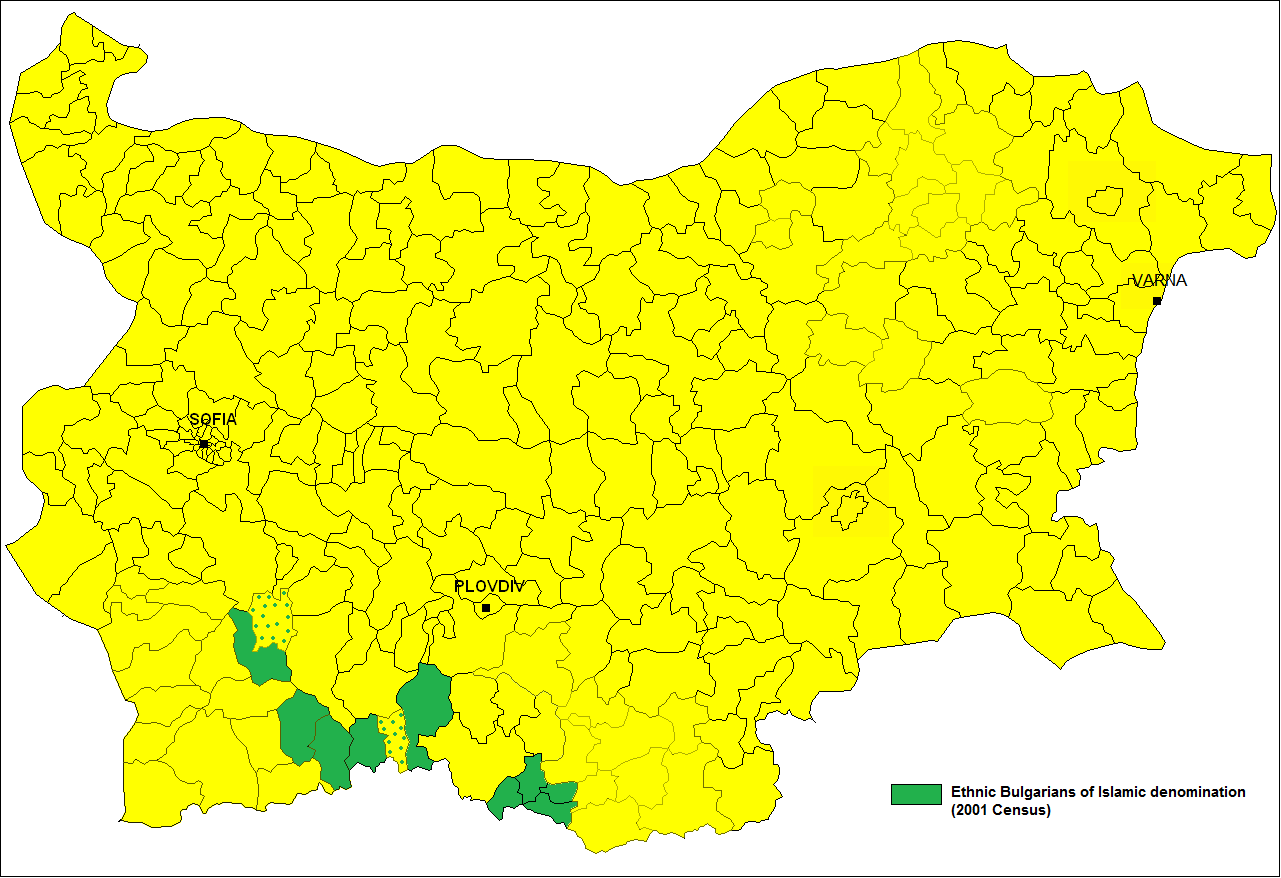
Regions where Pomaks reside

The mass turn to Islam in the Central Rhodope Mountains happened between the 16th and the 17th century. According to the Codes of Bishop of Philippoupolis and the Czech historian and slavicist Konstantin Josef Jireček in the middle of the 17th century, some Bulgarian provosts agreed to become Muslim en masse. They visited the Ottoman local administrator to announce their decision, but he sent them to the Greek bishop of Philippoupolis Gabriel (1636–1672). The bishop could not change their mind. According to the verbal tradition of the Greeks of Philippoupolis, a large ceremony of mass circumcision took place in front of the old mosque of the city, near the Government House. After that, the villagers became Muslim, too. According to the verbal tradition of the Bulgarians, Grand Vizier Köprülü Mehmed Pasha (1656–1661) threatened the Bulgarians of Chepino Valley that he would execute them if they didn't turn to Islam. In 1656, Ottoman military troops entered the Chepino valley and arrested the local Bulgarian provosts, in order to transfer them in the local Ottoman administrator. There, they converted to Islam. Grand Vizier Mehmed Köprülü, after the mass Islamization, destroyed 218 churches and 336 chapels in these areas. A lot of Bulgarians preferred to die instead of becoming Muslim. According to recent investigations the theory of forced conversion to Islam, supported by some scientists, has no solid grounds with all or most evidence being faked or misinterpreted. At the same time, the sincerity of the convert is a subject to suspicion and interrogation. Some authors for example, explain the mass conversions that occurred in the 17th century with the tenfold increase of the Jizya tax. Muslim communities prospered under the Ottoman Empire, as the Sultan was also the Caliph. Ottoman law did not recognize such notions as ethnicity or citizenship; thus, a Muslim of any ethnic background enjoyed precisely the same rights and privileges.

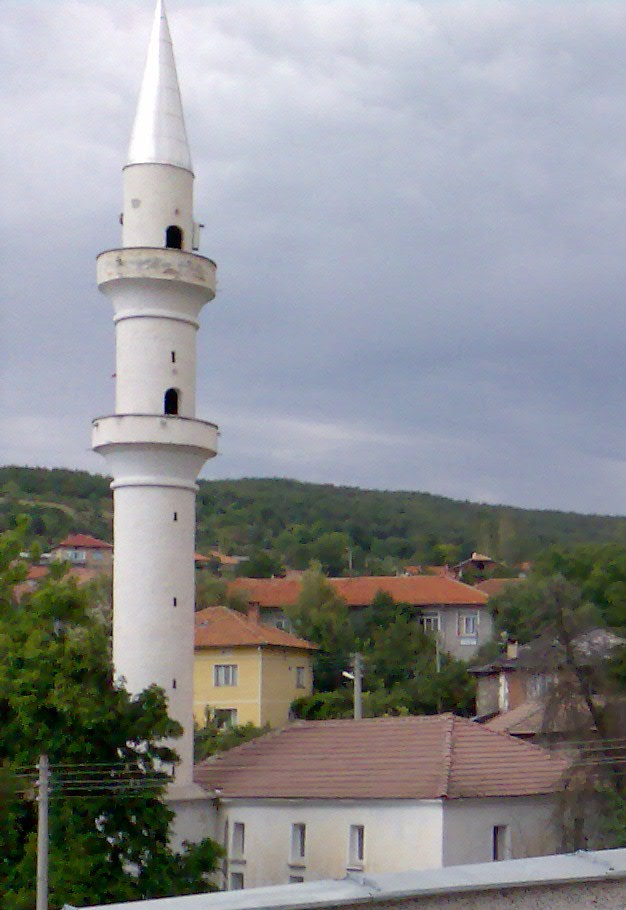
Tuhovishta's Mosque

Meanwhile, the perception of the millet concept was altered during the 19th century and rise of nationalism within the Ottoman Empire begun. After the Russo-Turkish War (1877–1878), Pomaks in the Vacha valley, apprehensive of retribution for their role in the bloody suppression of the April Uprising two years earlier, rebelled against Eastern Rumelia and established an autonomous state, called Republic of Tamrash. In 1886 the Ottoman government accepted the Bulgarian rule over Eastern Rumelia and that was the end of the free Pomak state. During the Balkan Wars, at 16 August 1913, an Islamic revolt begun in the Eastern Rhodopes and Western Thrace. On 1 September 1913, the "Provisional Government of Western Thrace" (Garbi Trakya Hukumet i Muvakkatesi) was established in Komotini. The Ottoman administration didn't support the rebels and finally under the neutrality of Greek and Ottoman governments, Bulgaria took over the lands on 30 October 1913. The rebels requested support by the Greek state and put Greek major in Alexandroupoli. Bulgaria, after a brief period of control over the area, passed the sovereignty of Western Thrace at the end of World War I. The Provisional Government was revived between 1919 and 1920 under French protectorate (France had annexed the region from Bulgaria in 1918) before Greece took over in June 1920.

After the dissolution of the Ottoman Empire following the First World War, the religious millet system disappeared and the members of the Pomak groups today declare a variety of ethnic identities, depending predominantly on the country they live in.

== Language ==
There is no specific Pomak dialect of the Bulgarian language. Within Bulgaria, the Pomaks speak almost the same dialects as those spoken by the Christian Bulgarians with whom they live side by side, and Pomaks living in different regions speak different dialects. In Bulgaria there is a trend for dialects to give way to the standard Bulgarian language; this is also affecting the dialects spoken by the Pomaks and thus their usage is now rare in urban areas and among younger people. As part of the wider Pomak community, the Torbeshi and Gorani in North Macedonia, Albania and Kosovo speak Macedonian or Torlakian dialects (incl. the Gora dialect), which are sometimes also considered to be part of the "wider Bulgarian dialect continuum".

Most Pomaks speak some of the Eastern Bulgarian dialects, mainly the Rup dialects in Southern Bulgaria and the Balkan dialects in Northern Bulgaria. The Pomaks living in the Bulgarian part of the Rhodopes speak the Rhodope (especially the Smolyan, Chepino, Hvoyna and Zlatograd subdialects) and Western Rup (especially the Babyak and Gotse Delchev sub-dialects) dialects. The Smolyan dialect is also spoken by the Pomaks living in the Western Thrace region of Greece. The Pomaks living in the region of Teteven in Northern Bulgaria speak the Balkan dialect, specifically the Transitional Balkan sub-dialect. The Rup dialects of the Bulgarian language spoken in Western Thrace are called in Greece Pomak language (Pomaktsou). Similar to Paulician dialect, it has words and resemblance to the grammatical forms of the Armenian language

The Pomak language is taught at primary school level (using the Greek alphabet) in the Pomak regions of Greece, which are primarily in the Rhodope Mountains. The Pomaks of Thrace were, together with Turks and Roma, exempted from the population exchanges provided by the Lausanne Treaty (1923). The treaty made no mention of their language, but declared that their languages of education should be Turkish and Greek. The main school manual used for the teaching the language is 'Pomaktsou' by Moimin Aidin and Omer Hamdi, Komotini 1997. There is also a Pomak-Greek dictionary by Ritvan Karahodja, 1996. The Pomak dialects are on the Eastern side of the Yat isogloss of Bulgarian, yet many pockets of western Bulgarian speakers remain. A large number of them no longer transmit it; they have adopted Turkish as a first language and Greek as a second language. Recently the Community of the Pomaks of Xanthi, has announced its request to be treated equally and therefore to have the right of education in Greek schools without the obligation of learning the Turkish language.

== Population ==
=== Bulgaria ===
The Pomaks in Bulgaria are referred to as Bulgarian Muslims (българи-мюсюлмани Balgari-Myusyulmani), and under the locally used names Ahryani (pejorative, meaning "infidels"), Pogantsi, Poturani, Poturnatsi, Eruli, Charaklii, etc. They mainly inhabit the Rhodope Mountains in Smolyan Province, Kardzhali Province, Pazardzhik Province and Blagoevgrad Province. There are Pomaks in other parts of Bulgaria as well. There are a few Pomak villages in Burgas Province, Lovech Province, Veliko Tarnovo Province and Ruse Province. Officially no ethnic Pomaks are recorded, while 67,000 declared Muslim and ethnic Bulgarian identity, down from 131,000 who declared Muslim Bulgarian identity at the 2001 census. Unofficially, there may be between 150,000 and 250,000 Pomaks in Bulgaria, though maybe not in the ethnic sense as one part declare Bulgarian, another part – Turkish ethnic identity. During the 20th century the Pomaks in Bulgaria were the subject of three state-sponsored forced assimilation campaigns – in 1912, the 1940s and the 1960s and 1970s which included the change of their Turkish-Arabic names to ethnic Bulgarian Christian Orthodox ones and in the first campaign conversions from Islam to Eastern Orthodoxy. The first two campaigns were abandoned after a few years, while the third was reversed in 1989. The campaigns were carried out under the pretext that the Pomaks as ancestral Christian Bulgarians who had been converted to Islam and who therefore needed to be repatriated back to the national domain. These attempts were met with stiff resistance by many Pomaks.

=== Turkey ===
Pomaks in Turkey community is present mostly in Eastern Thrace and to a lesser extent in Anatolia, where they are called in Turkish Pomaklar, and their speech, Pomakça. The Pomak community in Turkey is unofficially estimated to be between 300,000 and 600,000.

=== Greece ===
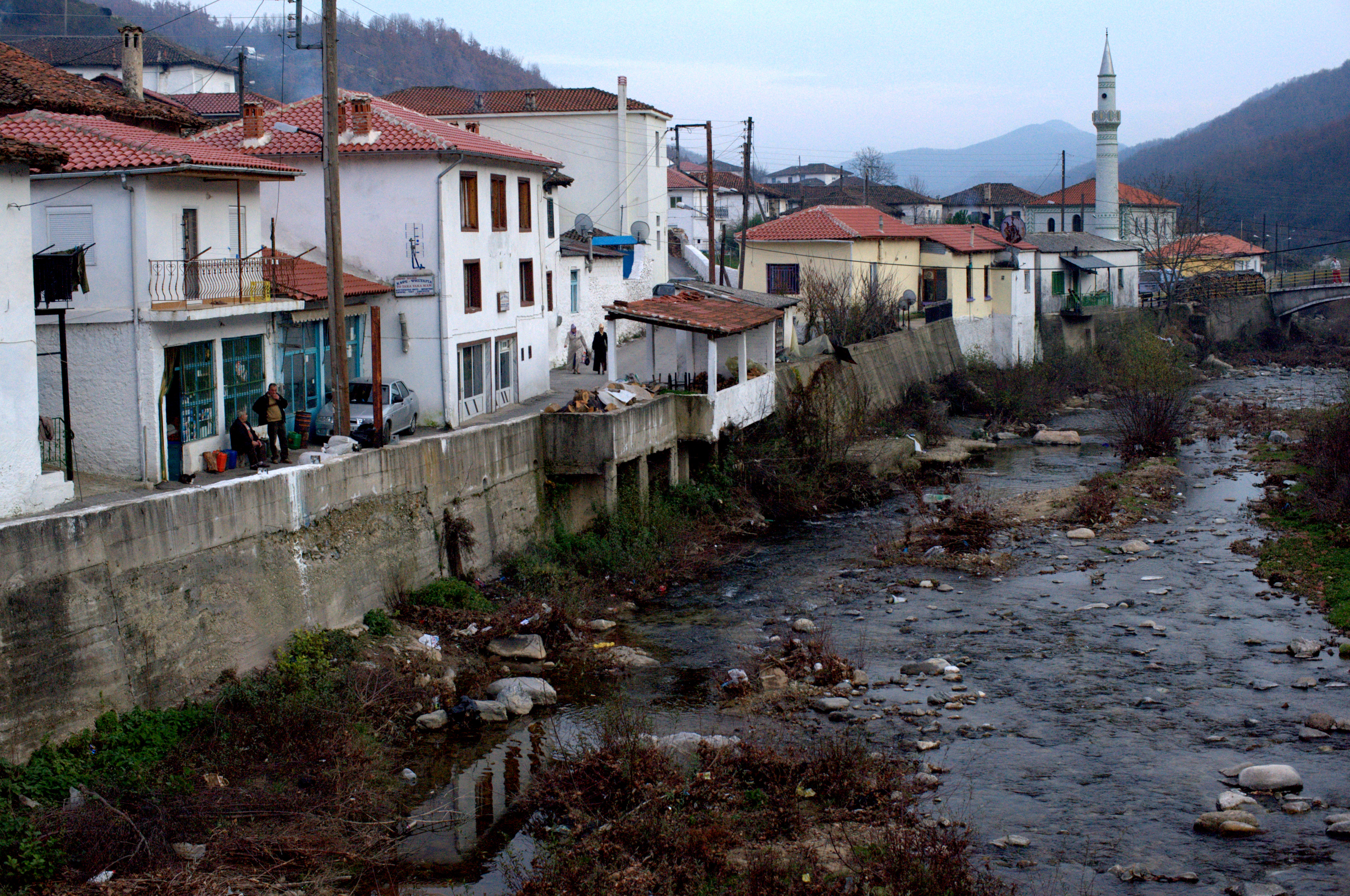
Medusa Pomak village, Xanthi, Thrace, Greece

Today the Pomaks (Greek: Πομάκοι) in Greece inhabit the region of East Macedonia and Thrace in Northern Greece, particularly the eastern regional units of Xanthi, Rhodope and Evros. Their estimated population is 50,000, only in Western Thrace. Until the Greco-Turkish War (1919–1922) and the Population exchange between Greece and Turkey in 1923 did Pomaks inhabit a part of the regions of Moglena – Almopia (Karadjova), Kastoria and some other parts of Greek Macedonia and North Macedonia. German sightseer Adolf Struck in 1898 describes Konstantia (in Moglena) as a big village with 300 houses and two panes, inhabited exclusively by Pomaks. Greek nationalist scholars and government officials frequently refer to the Pomaks as "slavicised" Greek Muslims, to give the impression and support Greek narratives that they are the descendants of Ottoman-era Greek converts to Islam like the Vallahades of Greek Macedonia. In contrast, international studies demonstrate that the group’s association with the Bulgarian-speaking area is undisputed, even though different patterns of identity compete within the group.

=== North Macedonia ===
The Macedonian Muslims (or Torbeši), are also referred to as Pomaks, especially in historical context. They are a minority religious group in North Macedonia, although not all espouse a Macedonian national identity and are linguistically distinct from the larger Muslim ethnic groups in the country, Albanians and Turks. However the estimated 100,000 Pomaks in North Macedonia maintain a strong affiliation to the Turkish identity.

=== Albania ===
Slavic-speaking Muslims, sometimes referred to as "Pomaks", live also in the Albanian region of Golloborda. However these people are also referred to as "Torbeš". Within Macedonian academia, their language has been regarded as Macedonian, while within Bulgarian academia, their dialect is considered as part of the Bulgarian language. Part of this people still self-identify as Bulgarians.

=== Kosovo ===
The Gorani occasionally are also referred to as Pomaks in historical context. They are people who inhabit the Gora region, located between Albania, Kosovo and North Macedonia. The general view is that they should be treated as a distinct minority group. Part of these people are already albanised. By the last censuses at the end of the 20th century in Yugoslavia they had declared themselves to be ethnic Muslims, like Bosniaks.

== Notable people ==
- Mehmed Talaat (1874–1921), Grand Vizier of the Ottoman Empire.
- Arif Sami Agush (born 1953), Member of the Bulgarian Parliament; Parliamentary Group of Movement for Rights and Freedoms. His ancestor was an Ottoman feudal called Agush Aga. The Agush castle (konak) is situated in the village of Mogilitsa. He was born in Sandrovo, Bulgaria.
- Rita Wilson (born 1956 as Margarita Ibrahimoff), American actress and producer, married to actor Tom Hanks. Born in Los Angeles, California, to a Pomak father and a Greek mother.
- Hussein Mumin (born 1987), Greek footballer. Born in Passos, Rhodope, Greece.

== See also ==
- Pomak language
- Pomak Republic
- Provisional Government of Western Thrace
