= II-19 road (Bulgaria) =

Road in Bulgaria

Republic Road I-19
- Републикански път I-19

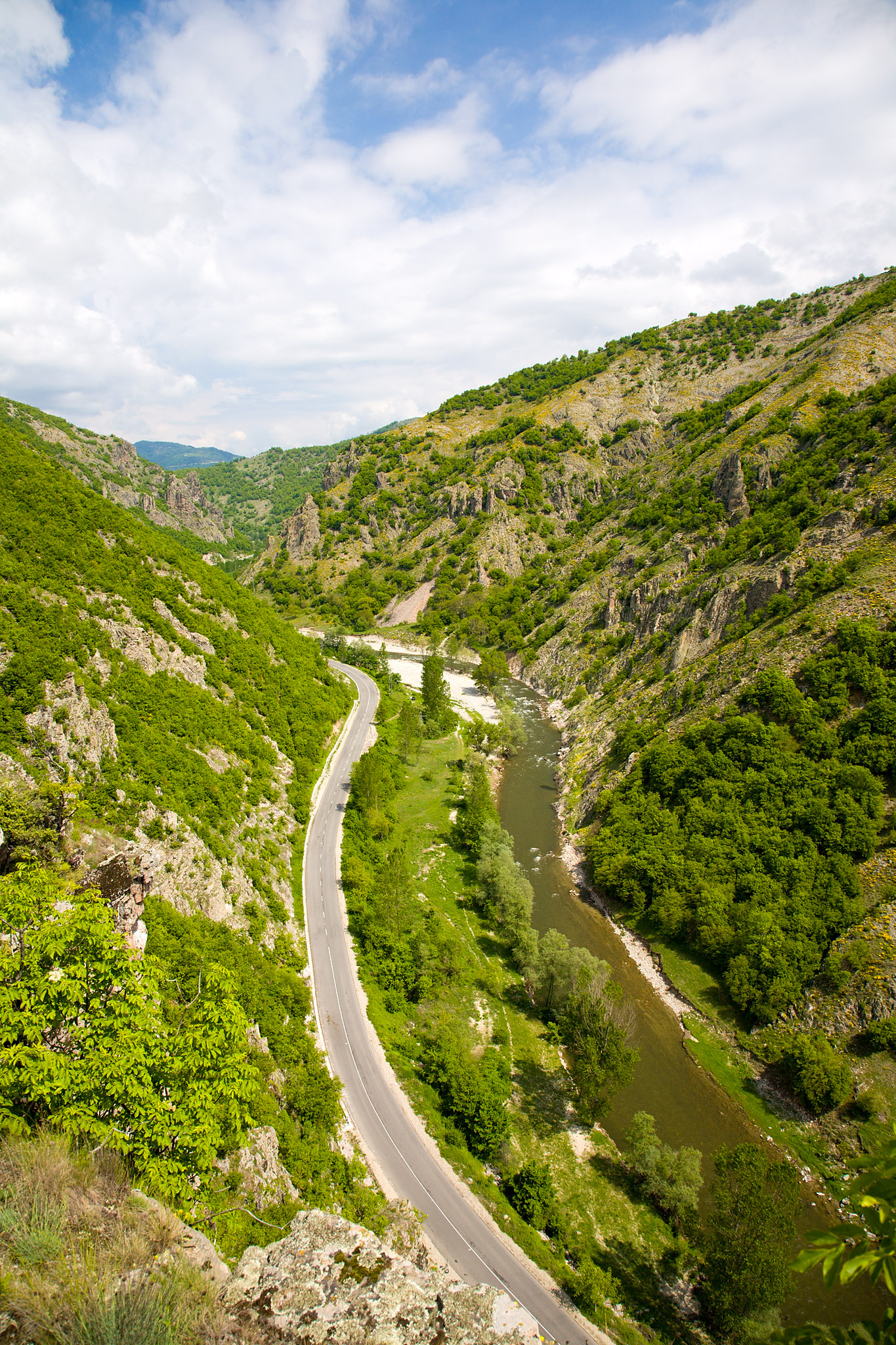

Route information
- Length: 109.7 km (68.2 mi)

Major junctions
- From: I-1 near Simitli
- To: Border with Greece at Ilinden

Location
- Country: Bulgaria
- Towns: Simitli, Bansko, Dobrinishte, Gotse Delchev

Highway system
- Highways in Bulgaria

Republican Road II-19 (Bulgarian: Републикански път II-19) is a second class road in Blagoevgrad Province, southwestern Bulgaria. Its length is 109.7 km.

== Route description ==
The road starts at Km 379.2 of the first class I-1 road at the town of Simitli, very close to the Struma motorway, and proceeds east upstream along the valley of the river Gradevska reka, a left tributary of the Struma. It passes through the village of Gradevo and along the Predel Saddle (1,140 m) between Bulgaria's highest mountain ranges, Rila and Pirin. The road then descends to the Razlog Valley and south of the town of Razlog turns south, passing through the towns of Bansko and Dobrinishte, and leaves the valley along the gorge of Momina Klisura (Mesta) on the river Mesta between Pirin and the Rhodope Mountains. In the gorge the road passes through the villages of Mesta and Gospodintsi, then enters the Gotse Delchev Valley, which it bisects from north to south. There, the road passes through the eastern part of the town of Gotse Delchev and the village of Novo Leski, Koprivlen and Sadovo. It then ascends the eastern slopes of the small mountain range Stargach and reaches the border checkpoint between Bulgaria and Greece at the village of Ilinden. The road crosses the border via a 700 m tunnel and continues as the EO57 road in Greece.
