= Gradevska reka =

Location
- Country: Bulgaria

Physical characteristics
- Source
  - location: SW of Kapatnik, Rila
  - coordinates: 41°56′33″N 23°21′21.96″E
  - elevation: 2,054 m (6,739 ft)
- Mouth
  - location: Strumna
  - coordinates: 41°53′35.16″N 23°6′56.88″E
  - elevation: 286 m (938 ft)
- Length: 31 km (19 mi)
- Basin size: 253 km^{2} (98 sq mi)

Basin features
- Progression: Struma→ Aegean Sea

The Gradevska reka (Bulgarian: Градевска река) is a 31 km-long river in southwestern Bulgaria, a left tributary of the river Struma.

The river takes its source under the name Zlata reka at an altitude of 2,054 m at 300 m southwest of the summit of Kapatnik (2,170 m) in the southwestern part of the Rila mountain range. In its first 5 km it flows south a turbulent mountain stream until reaching the Predel Saddle (1,140 m) and turning west-northwest. From there, along its whole course, the Gradevska reka forms the boundary between Bulgaria's highest mountain ranges, Rila in the north and Pirin in the south. Until the village of Gradevo, where it takes its largest tributary, the Osenovska reka, it flows in a gently sloping forested valley, named Elovitsa. Downstream of the village, the river valley widens and its slopes become deforested and eroded, while the riverbed is wide and filled with sediments. It flows into the Struma at an altitude of 286 m in the town of Simitli. The river drains parts of southwestern Rila and northernmost Pirin.

Its drainage basin covers a territory of 253 km^{2} or 1.34% of Struma's total.

The Gradevska reka has predominantly snow-rain feed with high water in May–June and low water in August–September. The average annual flow at its mouth is 1.91 m^{3}/s.

The river flows entirely in Blagoevgrad Province. There are two settlements along its course: the village of Gradevo and the town of Simitli, both in Simitli Municipality; its upper course is in Razlog Municipality. A 25.4 km stretch of the second class II-19 road road Simitli–Razlog–Gotse Delchev–Ilinden follows its valley between Simitli and Predela. In its upper course is located the Predela resort.
