= Lyalevo =

Lyalevo Лялево
- Lyalevo
- Coordinates: 41°30′N 23°46′E
- Country: Bulgaria
- Province: Blagoevgrad

Lyalevo or Lyalyovo (Bulgarian: Лялево, Ляльово, Greek: Λιάλεβο) is a former village in southernmost western Bulgaria which ceased to exist in 1960. Lyalevo is known as the only village within the modern borders of Bulgaria that was inhabited by Greek Muslims (Vallahades).

Lyalevo lay in the southeastern part of the Pirin mountains, in the southern part of the region of Pirin Macedonia. It was located at the foot of the Lalevski Vrah or Sveta Elena (Saint Helena) summit, 14 kilometres (8.7 mi) from the town of Gotse Delchev (Nevrokop). Today, its ruins fall administratively within the Bulgarian Blagoevgrad Province's Hadzhidimovo Municipality, close to the border with Greece and the Ilinden–Exochi border crossing. Lyalevo was mentioned as Lyaleva in Ottoman tax registers of 1623–1625 and 1635–1637 as a place populated by two Christian households. After 1821, though, the population mostly consisted of Greek-speaking Muslims. According to traditional stories recorded by Bulgarian ethnographer Vasil Kanchov, those Greeks came from the Chalkidiki peninsula on the Aegean Sea in the first quarter of the 19th century. They fled their home places and converted to Islam following the massacres in the wake of an unsuccessful anti-Ottoman uprising in 1821, as part of the Greek War of Independence. In 1845, Russian slavist Victor Grigorovich mentions the village as Lyaluhu and calls its residents "Greek Pomaks". Serbian scholar Stefan Verković notes that Lyalyuvo had 90 households or a population of 300 Greek Muslims in 1889. Vasil Kanchov's study of 1900 records the population of Lalyovo as 620 Greek Muslims.

After the Second Balkan War of 1913, Lyalevo's population moved to Greece because the village (as with all of Pirin Macedonia) became part of the Kingdom of Bulgaria. Some of the original inhabitants returned in 1916 only to abandon it forever in 1928, this time to settle in Turkey, while Bulgarian refugees from Greek Macedonia were settled in Lyalevo in 1926–1928. It ceased to exist in 1960 due to depopulation, as the inhabitants moved to other villages in the region, chiefly to Koprivlen.
