= Predel (Bulgaria) =

Predel Saddle
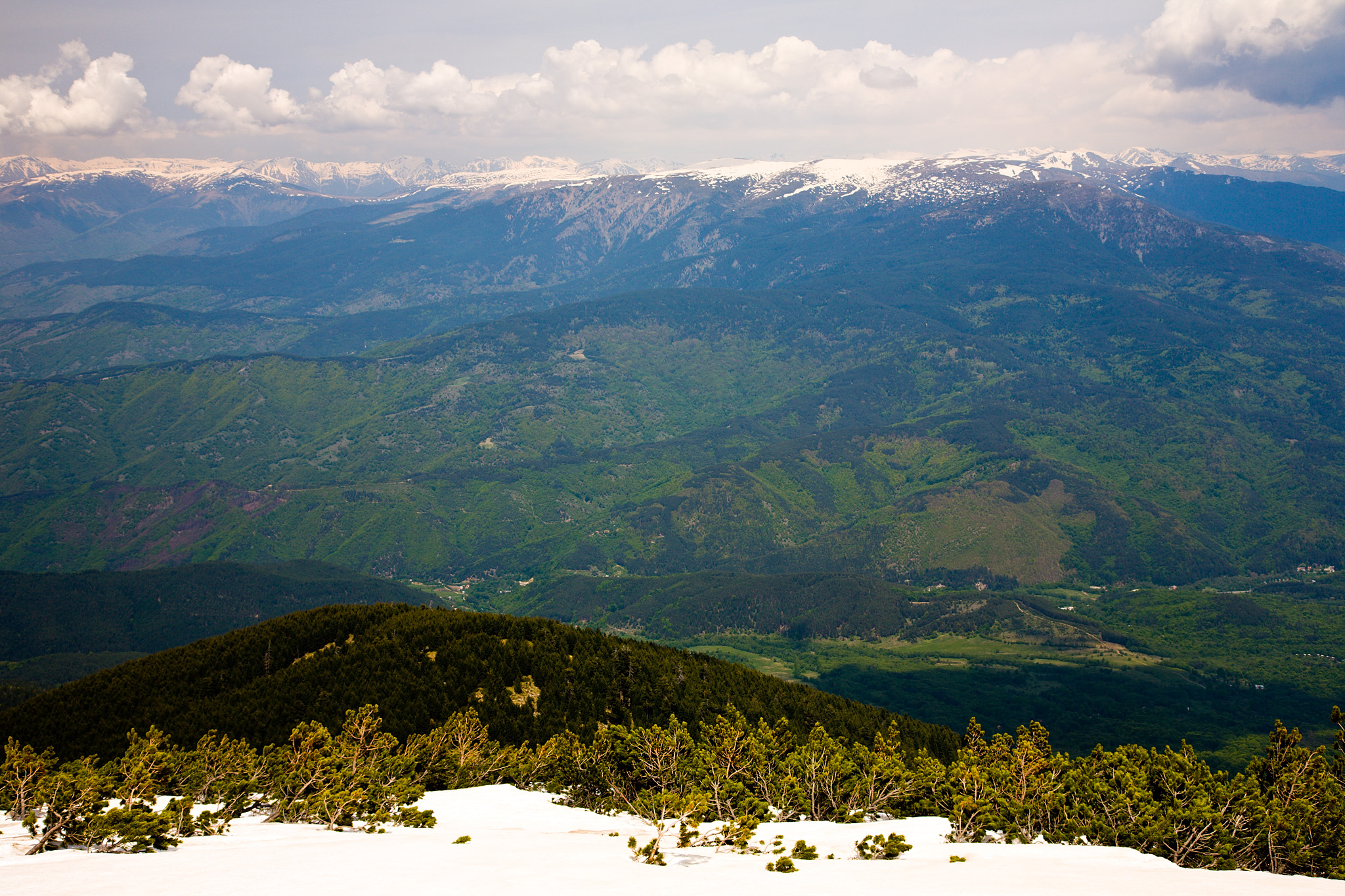
- View to the Predel Saddle from Mount Pirin with Rila at the background

- Location within Bulgaria
- Elevation: 1,140 metres (3,740 ft)

Third Approach
- Location: Bulgaria
- Range: Rila and Pirin
- Coordinates: 41°52′53″N 23°20′55″E

Predel (Bulgarian: Предел [prɛˈdɛɫ]) is a mountain saddle (pass) in western Bulgaria between the mountain ranges of Rila to the north and Pirin to the south. It is situated on the territory of the Simitli and Razlog municipalities in Blagoevgrad Province.

The pass is 20 km long with a maximum altitude of 1140 m. It connects of the valley of the river Struma in the west with the Razlog Valley in the east. It begins to the north-east from the village of Gradevo at 531 m altitude and runs in eastern and south-eastern direction upstream of the Elovitsa valley of the Struma basin. It reaches its highest point in 12.9 km and then descends along the valley of the river Iztok of the Mesta drainage. After 7.1 km it enters the westernmost area of the Razlog Valley at an altitude of 890 m.

A 20 km long section of the II-19 second-class road Simitli–Bansko–Gotse Delchev–Ilinden traverses the pass. Due to the increased tourist traffic to the ski resort of Bansko the road was thoroughly rehabilitated and expanded in 2005.

In the vicinity of the Predel Saddle there are about ten holiday homes with more than 1000 beds. There is a 1300 m long ski track named Kulinoto. Since 1965 there is a folklore festival "Pirin Sings" that gathers folk groups from around the nation. Predel has an important place in Bulgarian history, because the Kresna–Razlog uprising of 1878 broke out there. The rebellion was a spontaneous action of the local population in opposition to the decisions of the Congress of Berlin that left the region outside the borders of newly liberated Bulgaria.
