= Paril Saddle, Bulgaria =

Mountain pass in western Bulgaria

Paril Saddle
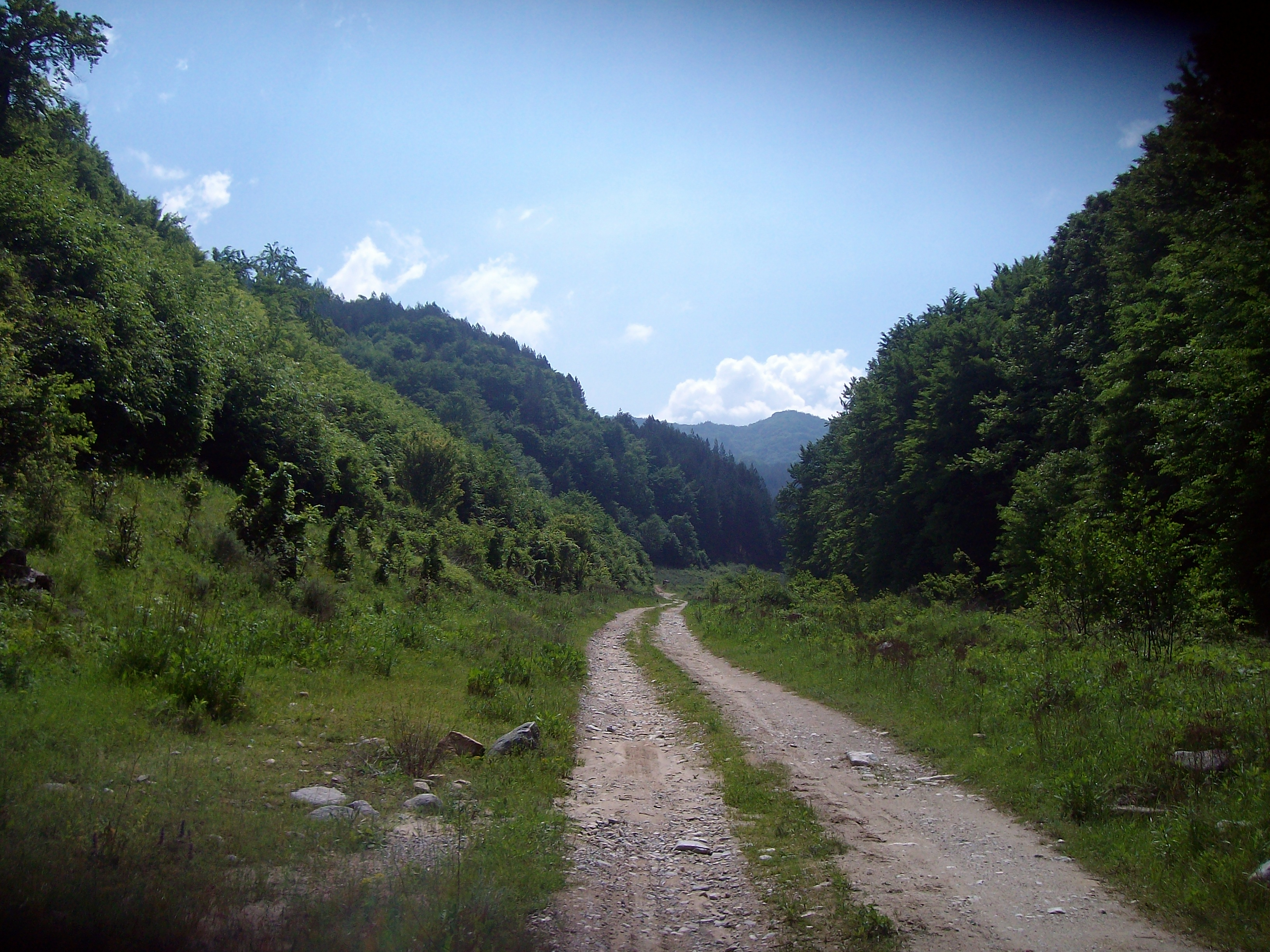
- Paril Saddle

- Location within Bulgaria
- Elevation: 1,174 metres (3,852 ft)

Third Approach
- Location: Bulgaria
- Range: Pirin and Slavyanka
- Coordinates: 41°25′34″N 23°39′00″E

Paril (Bulgarian: Парил) is a mountain saddle (pass) in western Bulgaria between the mountain ranges of Pirin to the north and Slavyanka to the south. It is situated on the territory of the Sandanski and Hadzhidimovo municipalities in Blagoevgrad Province.

The pass is 10.6 km long with a maximum altitude of 1176 m. It connects the Sandanski-Petrich Valley of the river Struma basin in the west and the Gotse Delchev Valley of the river Mesta basin in the east.

It begins to the north-east from the village of Paril at 817 m altitude and runs in western direction upstream of the Chokovitsa valley. It reaches its highest point of 1176 m after 4.6 km and then descends westwards along the valley of the river Chereshar where it terminates after 7 km at an altitude of 756 m.

Paril is traversed by a 10.6 km long section of the III-1906 third-class road Koprivlen–Paril–Katuntsi. This section is in poor condition and is accessible only for off-road vehicles. It is not maintained in winter. During the time of the Ottoman Empire, the road was a major communication artery, but today it has only local importance.

The saddle itself is short, wide and deep with mild slopes and has erosion origin. The geological foundation is predominantly of granite. The soils are brown forest. Paril is covered with beech forests. The saddle is crossed by the E4 European long distance path that links Pirin and Slavyanka. To the south is situated the Alibotush Reserve. At about 10 min to the east is located the Slavyanka refuge, an important starting point for a number of tourist routes in the vicinity.
