= Laki, Blagoevgrad Province =

Laki Лъки
- Village
- Location within Bulgaria
- Coordinates: 41°28′N 23°43′E
- Country: Bulgaria
- Province: Blagoevgrad Province
- Municipality: Hadzhidimovo Municipality

Government
  - Suffragan Mayor: Ivan Krushovski

Area
  - Total: 18.527 km^{2} (7.153 sq mi)
- Elevation: 829 m (2,720 ft)

Population (2020)
  - Total: 58
- Time zone: UTC+2 (EET)
  - Summer (DST): UTC+3 (EEST)

Laki is a village in Hadzhidimovo Municipality, in Blagoevgrad Province, Bulgaria.

== Geography ==
The village is situated in mountainous area 12 kilometres southwest of the town of Hadzhidimovo and 80 kilometres south-southeast of Blagoevgrad. Near the village is flowing the Matnitza river, a tributary to the Mesta river.

== History ==
In 1848, the Russian Slavist Victor Grigorovich wrote in his Essay on Travels in European Turkey that the inhabitants of Laki were Turks and Christians. In the Ethnography of the provinces of Adrianople, Monastir and Thessaloniki, published in Istanbul in 1878 and reflecting the statistics of the male population from 1873, Lika (Laki) is listed as a village with 81 households with 40 Muslims and 230 Bulgarians.

In 1891 Georgi Strezov wrote about the village:

"Laki, a village 4 hours south of Nevrokop, is located in the north of Libyahovo, lies in a valley next to a small tributary of Karasu. Residents work in the coal mining abroad near Thessaloniki and Chalkidiki peninsula. They go in the summer in Thessaloniki for harvesting and mowing. Houses 76. It is said that this number could not and would not increase: if it grows to this number of houses, it begins to die out and then falls to a minimum of 65 houses. Bulgarian Church. “

In 1889, Stefan Verkovic (Topographical and Ethnographic Essay of Macedonia) noted Lika (Laki) as a village with 63 Bulgarian and 18 Turkish houses.

== Economy and transportation ==
The main source of income for the people, living in the village is agriculture and livestock breeding. One hotel is working in Laki during the whole year. The village is connected with Hadzhidimovo with a fourth class asphalt road, accessible all year.

There are no other methods of transportation available.

== Religion ==
The cemetery church "St. Archangel Michael" was built in the XVI - XVII century, and "Assumption" - in 1844 and a cell school was opened next to it. Both temples have been declared cultural monuments.
