= Nova Lovcha =

- Village
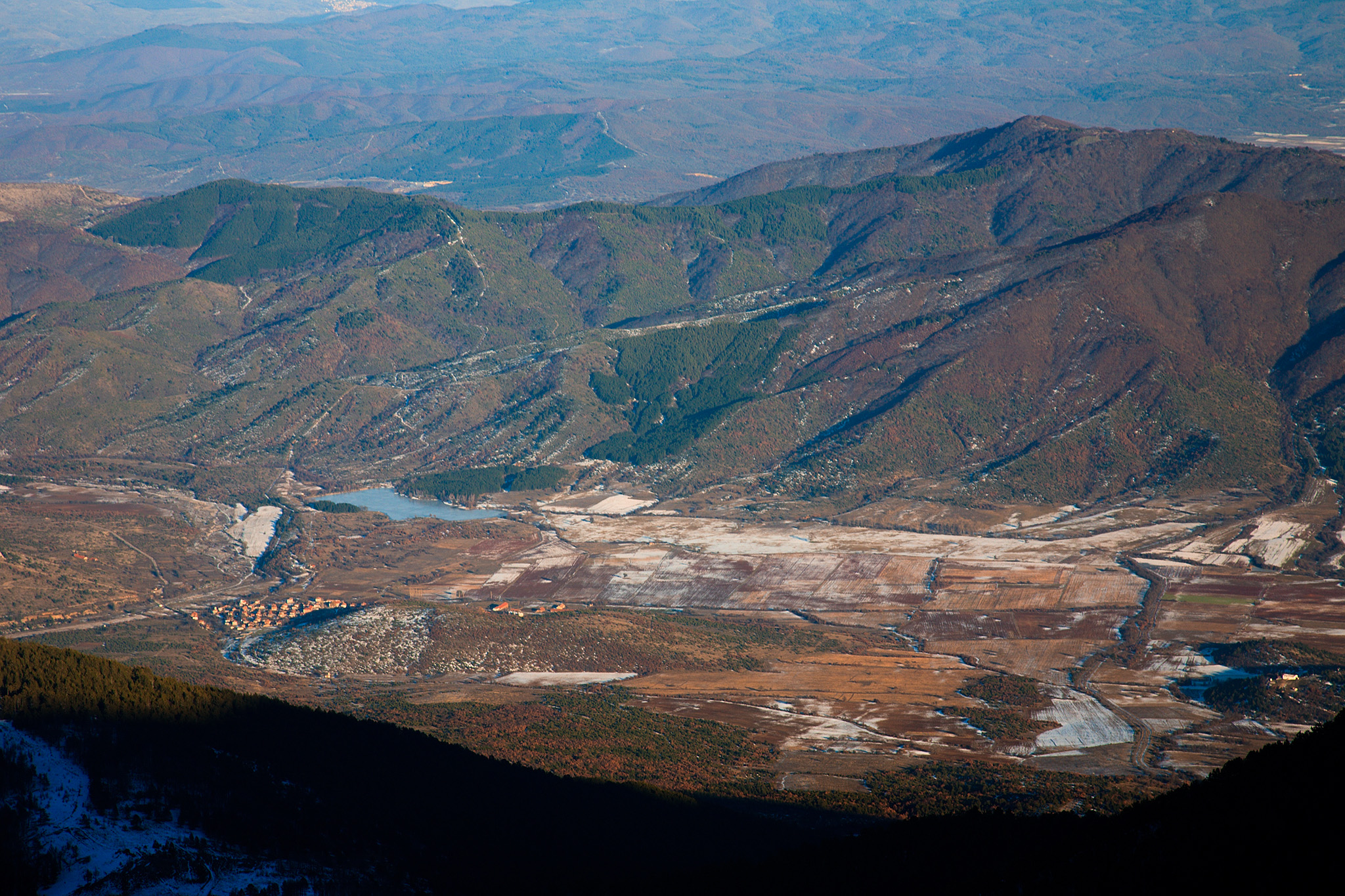

- Location within Bulgaria
- Coordinates: 41°25′N 23°43′E
- Country: Bulgaria
- Province: Blagoevgrad Province
- Municipality: Hadzhidimovo Municipality

Government
  - Suffragan Mayor: Geotgi Nedelin

Area
  - Total: 12.938 km^{2} (4.995 sq mi)
- Elevation: 701 m (2,300 ft)

Population (2019)
  - Total: 56
- Time zone: UTC+2 (EET)
  - Summer (DST): UTC+3 (EEST)

Nova Lovcha (Bulgarian: Нова Ловча) is a village in Hadzhidimovo Municipality, in Blagoevgrad Province, Bulgaria.

== Geography ==
Nova Lovcha is located at the foot of Slavyanka mountain on the Bulgarian-Greek border. The terrain is mostly hilly and flat on the east. The soils are brown. Near the village there is a drying river, which springs are near the village of Paril and is fed mostly by rain. 1–2 km east of the village there is a small artificial lake, which is also fed by rain and used for economic activities. The climate is continental-Mediterranean. The summers are hot and dry and the winters are cold. The average temperature in summer is 24-25 ° С. The winter is mild. The maximum temperature in winter is 1-2 °C. Precipitation is about 600–700 mm per year. The wind is light to moderate in summer. The snow cover in winter reaches 1 meter.

== History ==
=== Before 1913 ===
In the area around the village there are remains of ancient settlements, as well as an old Roman road connecting Nicopolis ad Nestum with Thessaloniki and the Aegean region.

In the 19th century, Lovcha was one of the most developed blacksmith villages in the area. Its inhabitants were specialised in making horseshoe wedges and supply the entire Thessaloniki region.

Alexander Sinve ("Les Grecs de l'Empire Ottoman. Etude Statistique et Ethnographique"), based on Greek data, wrote in 1878 that 1 250 Greeks lived in the Loftcha, Melnik diocese. In the Ethnography of the Provinces of Adrianople, Monastir and Thessaloniki , published in Istanbul in 1878 and reflecting the statistics of the male population from 1873, Loftcha is listed as a village with 125 households and 450 Muslims, 900 Bulgarians and 40 Vlachs. In 1889, Stefan Verkovic (Topographic and Ethnographic Essay of Macedonia) noted Lovcha as a village with 125 Bulgarian houses.

In 1891 Georgi Strezov wrote about the village:

"Lofcha, six hours south of Nevrokop. It was built on a plain terrain ìn the Ali Botush (Slavyanka) mountain; the soil is dry and contains many iron impurities, which give it a red color. Greek church and school. Two years ago, the Bulgarian teacher was expelled. There are 20 students. Houses 120, Bulgarian.“

According to the statistics of Vasil Kanchov ("Macedonia. Ethnography and Statistics") by 1900 the population of the village numbered 1300 Bulgarian Christians. Peyo Yavorov in his book "Haidushki kopnenia" writes:

"Lovcha was an excellent village both in terms of people and armament"

According to the Secretary of the Bulgarian Exarchate Dimitar Mishev ("La Macedoine et sa Population Chrétienne") in 1905 in Lovcha (Lovtcha) there are 1760 Bulgarian exarchists (Orthodox Christians with the Bulgarian Exarchate) and in the village there is a Bulgarian primary school with 1 teacher and 77 students.

=== In Greece ===
In 1913, after the Second Balkan War, Lovcha remained in the territory of Greece, 100 meters south from the border. In 1918 the village had 250 houses and over 1700 people. After the changes that took place from 1926 to 1927 (the Mollov - Kafandaris agreement) some of the inhabitants of Lovcha emigrated 1-2 kilometers inland within Bulgaria and founded the new village, and some settled in Nevrokop and Pleven.

1/3 of the lands of the village remained in the territory of Bulgaria and 2/3 were within the borders of today's Greece. Greek refugees have taken the place of the Bulgarians. In 1927 the village was renamed Acrino (Ακρινό, Ακρινόν). By 1928, Lovcha was a refugee village with 58 families and 188 refugees. However, the village was later deserted and today only the church of St. Archangel Michael is preserved, the rest is in ruins.

== Economy and transportation ==
The agriculture is the main source of income in the village. It is connected with Hadzhidimovo by a fourth class asphalt road, accessible all seasons.

== Religion ==
The inhabitants of the village are entirely Orthodox Christians. There are two churches in the village - the cemetery church "St. Prophet Elijah" and "St. Archangel Michael", built with the personal labour of many of the villagers.
