= Blatska =

Blatska Блатска
- Village
- Location within Bulgaria
- Coordinates: 41°32′N 23°52′E
- Country: Bulgaria
- Province: Blagoevgrad Province
- Municipality: Hadzhidimovo Municipality

Government
  - Mayor: Tughay Neby (SDS)

Area
  - Total: 10.33 km^{2} (3.99 sq mi)
- Elevation: 532 m (1,745 ft)

Population (2015-12-31)
  - Total: 599
- Time zone: UTC+2 (EET)
  - Summer (DST): UTC+3 (EEST)

Blatska is a village in Hadzhidimovo Municipality, in Blagoevgrad Province, Bulgaria. It is situated in the valley of the Mesta river, close to the border with Greece.

== History ==
There is an ancient and medieval fortress named "Hysar" 1 km (0.62 mi) east of the center of the village.

In the list of the villages and the number of non-Muslim households in the Nevrokop vilayet by March 13 1660 the village is mentioned as one with 15 non-Muslim households.

In the 19th century Blatska is a Muslim village in the Nevrokop kaaza. In the book "Ethnography of the Adrianopol, Monastir and Salonika vilayets", published in Istanbul in 1878, presenting the statistics of the male population in 1873, the village is mentioned as one with 40 households and 100 Muslim people. According to Vasil Kanchov at the end of 19th century there were 50 Turkish houses.

In 1899 there were 215 people according to the census of the Ottoman Empire.

== Education ==
A primary school named "St.St. Cyril and Methodius" is yet functional.

== Economy ==
The main source of income is cultivation of tobacco.

== Religion ==
The population is Muslim. There is a mosque at the center of the village.

== Roads and transportation ==
Blatska is situated just 2 km (1.2 mi) north of the municipal center Hadzhidimovo and is connected with it by bus. There are two asphalted municipal roads passing through the village.
