= Paril Saddle =

Saddle on Livingston Island, Antarctica

- Saddle
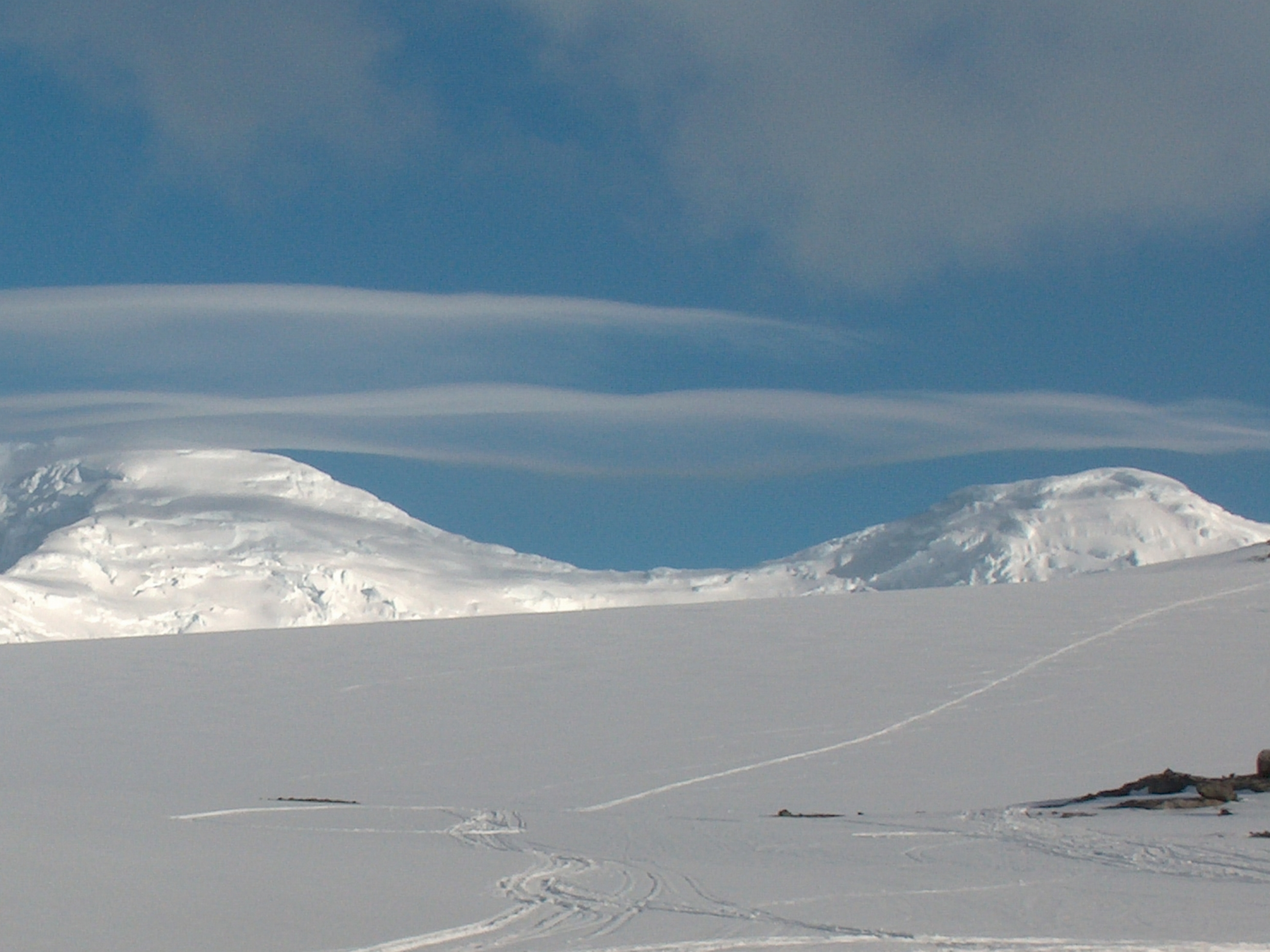
- Paril Saddle from St. Kliment Ohridski Base

- Location within Antarctica
- Coordinates: 62°41′01.5″S 60°11′53″W
- Location: Livingston Island, South Shetland Islands, Antarctica
- Part of: Friesland Ridge, Tangra Mountains
- Etymology: Paril and the adjacent Paril Saddle, Bulgaria
- Elevation: 1,398 m (4,587 ft)

Paril Saddle (Parilska Sedlovina \pa-'ril-ska se-dlo-vi-'na\) is a saddle of elevation 1,398 m (4,587 ft) in Friesland Ridge in Tangra Mountains on Livingston Island, Antarctica. Bounded by St. Boris Peak to the northeast, and Simeon Peak to the southwest. Overlooking Macy Glacier to the east and southeast, and Huntress Glacier to the west and northwest. Bulgarian topographic survey in 1995/96 (estimated elevation 1,390 m (4,560 ft)), and mapping in 2005 and 2009. It was first visited and GPS-surveyed by the Bulgarian climbers D. Boyanov, N. Petkov and N. Hazarbasanov on 15 January 2017.

The feature is named after the settlement of Paril and the adjacent homonymous saddle between Pirin Mountain and Slavyanka Mountain in southwestern Bulgaria.

Location of Tangra Mountains on Livingston Island in the South Shetland Islands.

Topographic map of Livingston Island and Smith Island.

== Maps ==
- L.L. Ivanov et al. Antarctica: Livingston Island and Greenwich Island, South Shetland Islands. Scale 1:100000 topographic map. Sofia: Antarctic Place-names Commission of Bulgaria, 2005.
- L.L. Ivanov. Antarctica: Livingston Island and Greenwich, Robert, Snow and Smith Islands. Scale 1:120000 topographic map. Troyan: Manfred Wörner Foundation, 2009. ISBN 978-954-92032-6-4
- Antarctic Digital Database (ADD). Scale 1:250000 topographic map of Antarctica. Scientific Committee on Antarctic Research (SCAR). Since 1993, regularly upgraded and updated.
- L.L. Ivanov. Antarctica: Livingston Island and Smith Island. Scale 1:100000 topographic map. Manfred Wörner Foundation, 2017. ISBN 978-619-90008-3-0
- A. Kamburov and L. Ivanov. Bowles Ridge and Central Tangra Mountains: Livingston Island, Antarctica. Scale 1:25000 map. Sofia: Manfred Wörner Foundation, 2023. ISBN 978-619-90008-6-1
