= Ablanitsa, Blagoevgrad Province =

Ablanitsa Абланица
- Village
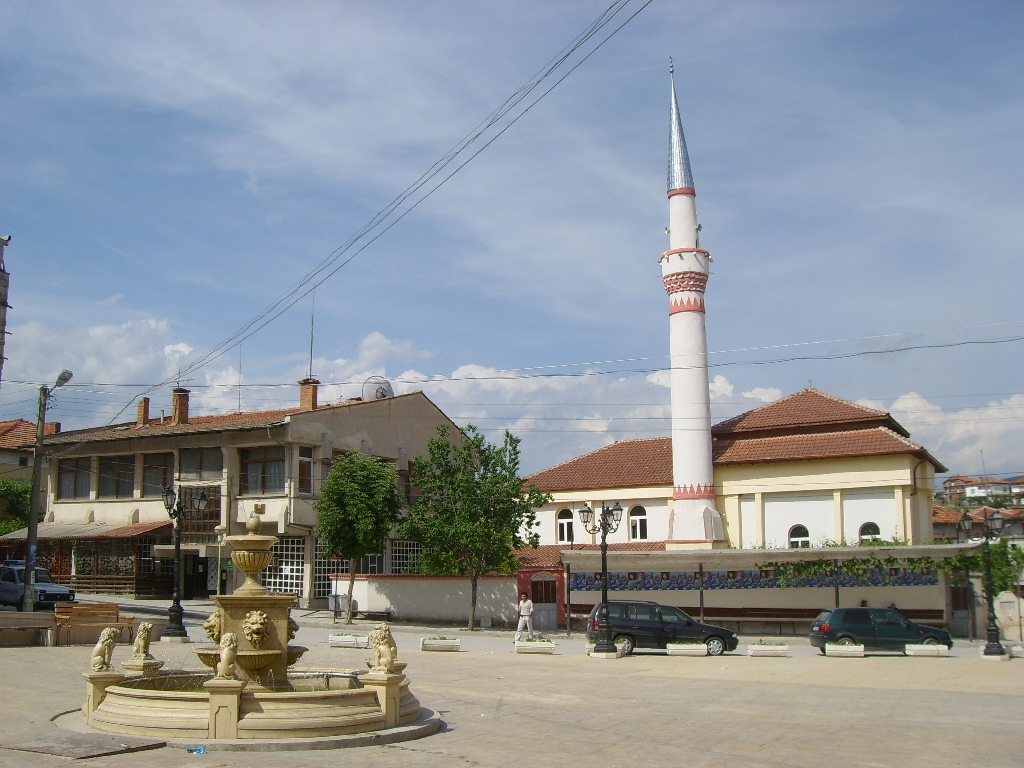

- Location within Bulgaria
- Coordinates: 41°32′16″N 23°56′5″E
- Country: Bulgaria
- Province: Blagoevgrad Province
- Municipality: Hadzhidimovo Municipality

Government
  - Mayor: Adem Arnaudov (DPS)

Area
  - Total: 33.663 km^{2} (12.997 sq mi)
- Elevation: 650 m (2,130 ft)

Population (2018.12.31)
  - Total: 2,503
- Time zone: UTC+2 (EET)
  - Summer (DST): UTC+3 (EEST)

Ablanitsa (Bulgarian: Абланица) is a village in Hadzhidimovo Municipality, in Blagoevgrad Province, Bulgaria.

== Geography ==
Ablanitsa is located 22 km southeast of the town of Gotse Delchev and 9 km east of the municipal center of Hadzhidimovo, in the semi-mountainous southwestern part of the Dabrash ridge of the Western Rhodope Mountains. Its land is located between the valleys of the Mesta River to the southwest and its left tributary the Chechka Bistritsa to the east, forming its natural boundary. The village is part of the Chech historical and geographical area, divided between Bulgaria and Greece, made up of 60 villages populated by Pomaks.

The climate is transitional Mediterranean with a mountain influence with favorable conditions for the cultivation of heat-loving crops - tobacco, vineyards, figs, almonds, cotton, maize and others. It is characterized by mild and rainy winters and warm and dry summers.

In 1959 a pumping station was built to supply water for irrigation of arable land, and an artificial dam was built near the village. With its 16,223 acres of adjacent area, the settlement is the largest in the municipality.

== History ==
Historical sources show that Ablanitsa is one of the most ancient settlements along the Mesta River in the Chech area. The first written sources in which the village is listed as a settlement under the names Aplanche, Ablaniche and Ablanije are Ottoman registers from the end of the 15th century. In another Ottoman register from Timur Hisar vilayet from the end of 1617 the village is listed as Ablaniche.

The earlier development of the settlement is evidenced by archaeological excavations and finds in the village and the surrounding area, researched and recorded by Bulgarian archaeologists, historians and researchers. A number of other archaeological finds from ancient settlements and necropolises located near the village give us additional information about the formation and development of the village. Both Slavic and Thracian settlements and shrines have been discovered and studied, and the objects and inventory found there indicate both early community development and the presence of different cultures that have left their testimonies to their centuries-old existence. Summarizing these facts, it is claimed that the beginning of the settlement was made by the Thracians with the formation of a settlement of several huts in the Baltachitsa locality. As this settlement is strategically located close to one of the most developed thoroughfares since ancient times, it is the road connecting the interior of Bulgaria, passing through Plovdiv, Peshtera, Batak, Dospat, through the villages of Satovcha, Ablanitsa, crossing the river Mesta, through Vozem, Belotintsi, Seres, Thessaloniki and Athens and used for commercial and transport activity, built and maintained by the Romans, whose remains can be seen today in the Kardaloma area, start its development and was established as a developed settlement in the early Middle Ages.

The land of Ablanitsa is rich in archeological monuments. In the Tumbata locality southwest of the village, traces of a settlement existed during the Late Bronze Age (14th - 12th centuries BC). In the following centuries, it moved about 5 km southwest of the village in the Stavrak area. From the 4th century BC in the Drezhno locality (about 6 km west of Ablanitsa) a large settlement developed and existed during the Middle Ages. Near it were found graves from the late Iron Age, from the ancient and medieval times with a variety of tomb implements. To the north of Drezhno is a collective find of bronze coins dating from the time of the Macedonian king Philip (220 - 179 BC). About 4 km north of the village, in the area of Shapran, there are traces of an ancient settlement (5 - 1 c. BC); there are tombstones near it. Remains of an ancient settlement with a fortress wall were discovered in the Milenovo area (about 4 km west of Ablanitsa). [9] In the Mirule locality (about 2 km south of the village) a necropolis of antiquity and the Middle Ages; there are remains of a settlement near it. Graves with very old stone slabs with Islamic inscriptions have been found in the courtyard of today's mosque, where they are also stored. About 7 km west of the village in the Church area are the ruins of a medieval church; southwest of it (about 1 km) there are graves surrounded by stone slabs. In February 1912, the village was attacked in an attempt to convert the people to Christianity and to change their Muslim names from three successive invaders Munyo Voivoda, M. Marvakov from Gotse Delchev and Tikvarov from Batak. Dozens were killed in the village after these actions. The massacre was carried out by M. Marvakov's group in the Ravo Livade area, where more than 30 civilians were killed and in a ravine near the village of Garmen, where more than 50 people were killed, called the ravine. Ablanishko in memory of the killed inhabitants of the village. After the altercation, the village was burnt down and looted by the Chetniks. In the spring of the same year, in order to avoid another altercation with the population, the surviving elders and princes decided mass emigration to neighboring Greece, the village of Rasca, where they spent one year in exile. After the war, families from the villages of Bachevo, Garmen, Varvara and Kyonovo (located in Burgas region) settled in Ablanitsa. After the First World War (1914 - 1918), Bulgarian refugee families settled in the villages of Karakyoy (Katafito), Belotintsi (Leukogia), and Vozem (Eksokhi) Drama. In 1919 an agricultural friendship was formed. In 1942 a credit cooperative Slatina was established in Ablanitsa.

Until 1944, cattle breeding and agriculture - viticulture and fruit growing were the main livelihoods. At that time, Ablanitsa was famous for its vineyards.

== Population ==
In the 19th century Ablanitsa was a Muslim village in the Nevrokop kaza of the Ottoman Empire. In the Ethnography of the vilayets of Adrianople, Monastir and Thessaloniki, published in Constantinople in 1878 and reflecting the male population statistics of 1873, Ablanitsa is cited as a village with 150 households and 370 Pomak residents. According to statistics by Vasil Kanchov (Macedonia. Ethnography and Statistics), Ablanitsa (Ablanitsa) is a Turkish settlement by 1900. It houses 1030 Turks in 210 houses. According to Stefan Verkovich, by the end of the 19th century, Ablanitsa had a Muslim male population of 471, living in 150 houses.

In 1899 the village had a population of 1300 according to the results of the census of the population of the Ottoman Empire. [6] According to Dimitar Hadzhanov, 1692 Pomaks live in Ablanitsa, Bogolin and Kribul in 1916.

At the beginning of the 21st century the village numbered about 3000 people. The population is growing from natural growth. Intense migration took place in 1959 - 1960 for the Krichim station (today Stamboliyski) and the village of Enina near the town of Kazanlak. 20th and 21st Century Data:

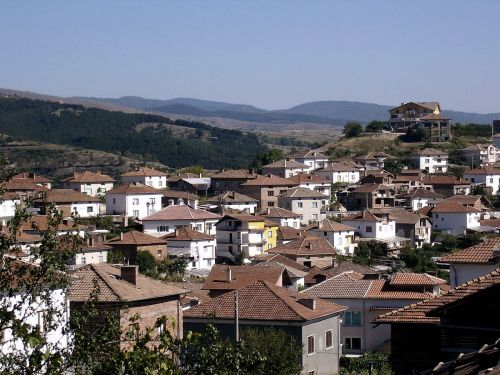
General view of Ablanitsa

- 1920 – 940 people;
- 1926 – 1139 people;
- 1934 – 1191 people;
- 1946 – 1325 people;
- 1956 – 1450 people;
- 1965 – 1630 people;
- 1975 – 1969 people;
- 1985 – 2360 people;
- 1992 – 2569 people;
- 2001 – 2615 people;
- 2011 – 2629 people;
- 2018 – 2503 people;

== Economy and transportation ==
The agriculture is characterized by animal husbandry and crop production, especially tobacco farming. In Ablanitsa, there are clothing factories. The commercial servicing of the population is carried out by numerous shops, restaurants, and a patisserie. There is a cadastral and regulatory plan. The housing fund has been completely renovated. The preserved old residential buildings combine the features of the plain open house and the Rhodope house; the massive stone walls on both floors and the attic furnaces are typical. The village is electrified, water-supplied, sewage; much of the street network is paved with asphalt. The village is accessible only by road. It is connected with Hadzhidimovo by bus. There is a postal station. The village is provided with land lines and mobile service.

== Education ==
There is a high school named "St. Paisii Hilendarski" (St. Paisius of Hilendar), founded in 1925 year as a primary school. It became middle school in 1963 year. In 1993 it became high school and an additional building is renovated for the purpose with voluntary labor from the villagers. A community center "Prosveta" ("Education") was found in 1940 year with a library. A new building is opened in 1960 year. There is a male folklore ensemble. There is a kindergarten "Prolet" ("Spring").

== Religion ==
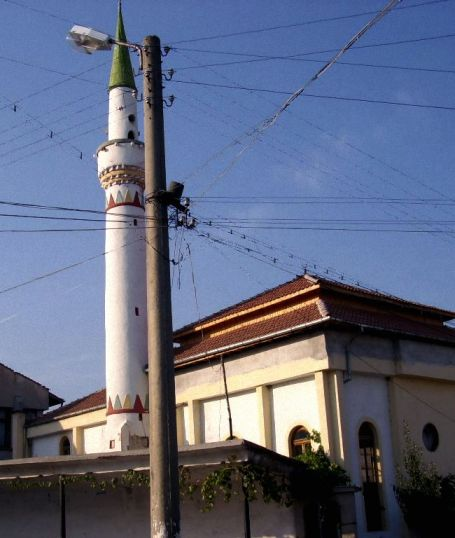
The mosque in Ablanitsa

The population is predominantly Muslim. There is a mosque in the center of the village.
