= Petrelik =

- Village
- Location within Bulgaria
- Coordinates: 41°29′N 23°52′E
- Country: Bulgaria
- Province: Blagoevgrad Province
- Municipality: Hadzhidimovo Municipality

Government
  - Suffragan Mayor: Todor Prokopov

Area
  - Total: 26.207 km^{2} (10.119 sq mi)
- Elevation: 626 m (2,054 ft)

Population (2019)
  - Total: 159
- Time zone: UTC+2 (EET)
  - Summer (DST): UTC+3 (EEST)

Petrelik is a village in Hadzhidimovo Municipality, in Blagoevgrad Province, Bulgaria. Most recently, in 2017, it has been the site of the German-Bulgarian film Western

== Geography ==
The village of Petrelik is located in a mountainous area in the mountain of Slavyanka. The river Matnitsa flows along the village. It is just 3 km from the Greek border and 4 km south of the municipal centre Hadzhidimovo.
