= Paril =

Paril Парил
- Village
- Location within Bulgaria
- Coordinates: 41°26′N 23°41′E
- Country: Bulgaria
- Province: Blagoevgrad Province
- Municipality: Hadzhidimovo Municipality

Government
  - Suffragan Mayor: Georgi Nedelin

Area
  - Total: 14.948 km^{2} (5.771 sq mi)
- Elevation: 915 m (3,002 ft)

Population (2019)
  - Total: 10
- Time zone: UTC+2 (EET)
  - Summer (DST): UTC+3 (EEST)

Paril (Bulgarian: Парил) is a village in Hadzhidimovo Municipality, in Blagoevgrad Province, Bulgaria.

== Geography ==
The village of Paril is located in a mountainous region in the historical-geographical region of Marvashko. It is located at the foot of Tsari Vrah in Slavyanka Mountain (Alibotush) and the southern slopes of Pirin Mountain. The Paril saddle divides these two mountains. The village is a starting point for "Slavyanka" hut and for hiking on the mountain of the same name with its natural resources and caves.

== History ==
Paril is a village with a rich historical past. Archaeological remains from different historical epochs have been found in the village. Fortress walls of a Roman settlement and a water supply system have been discovered near the Paril Tower. Even today, old coins are found in the fields, evidence of intensive settlement life.

In the 19th century the village was a small purely Bulgarian settlement, belonging to the Nevrokop kaza of the Serres sanjak. The church "St. St. Constantine and Helena" was built in the early nineteenth century. In the Ethnography of the Provinces of Adrianople, Monastir and Thessaloniki, published in Constantinople in 1878 and reflecting the statistics of the male population from 1873, Paril is listed as a village with 35 households and 130 Bulgarian inhabitants. In 1889, Stefan Verkovic ("Topographic and Ethnographic Essay of Macedonia") noted Paril as a homestead with 45 Bulgarian houses.

In 1891 Georgi Strezov wrote about the village:

"Paril Chiflik, on the south of Gaitaninovo. A few years ago it was a homestead; the peasants bought their land. Agriculture comes first;... It lies in a valley at the foot of Ali Botush. A church where Greek is read. Between Gaitaninovo and Paril Chiflik you can see the ruins of a castle, which are still called "The Tower". Below are Gradishta. The number of houses amounts to 50; Bulgarian. “ According to the statistical research of Vasil Kanchov ("Macedonia. Ethnography and Statistics"), by 1900 the population of the village numbered a total of 300 people, all Bulgarian Christians.".

According to the Secretary of the Bulgarian Exarchate Dimitar Mishev ("La Macedoine et sa Population Chrétienne") in 1905 in Paril (Poril) live 432 Bulgarians. There is a Bulgarian primary school in the village with 1 teacher and 12 students.

At the outbreak of the Balkan War in 1912, six people from the village were volunteers in the Macedonian-Edirne militia.

== Economy and transportation ==
There are no economical subjects in the village. Only one guesthouse is accepting tourists during the whole year. The village is accessible during the whole year by asphalted road, connecting the municipal centre Hadzhidimovo with the village of Katuntsi and Petrich. The road is mountainous and difficult in winter conditions.

== Institutions ==
There are not any administrative institutions in Paril. The elementary school "St. Clement of Ohrid", founded in 1933 year is closed, because there are no students in the village.

== Religion ==
The people in the village are predominantly Orthodox Christian. The first church in Paril was built during Ottoman rule. It has not survived to the present day. The St. Constantine and Helene church was consecrated in 1936.

== Honours ==
Paril Saddle in Antarctica is named after the village.
