= Greek National Road 57 =

Trunk road in Greece

National Road 57
- Εθνική Οδός 57
- Route of the EO57 road, in blue

Route information
- Length: 48.8 km (30.3 mi)
- Existed: 9 July 1963–present

Major junctions
- South end: Drama
- North end: Border with Bulgaria (Exochi)

Location
- Country: Greece
- Regions: Eastern Macedonia and Thrace
- Primary destinations: Drama; Kato Nevrokopi; Exochi

Highway system
- Highways in Greece; Motorways; National roads
| ← EO56 | → EO58 |

Greek National Road 57 (Greek: Εθνική Οδός 57), abbreviated as the EO57, is a national road in northern Greece. The EO57 runs within the Drama regional unit, from Drama to the border crossing with Bulgaria near Exochi: however, the border crossing itself was turned into a tunnel in 2005.

== Route ==
The EO57 is officially defined as a north–south road within the Drama regional unit: the EO57 runs between the city of Drama to the south and the border with Bulgaria near Exochi to the north, passing through Kato Nevrokopi. The border crossing itself became a tunnel on 9 December 2005. The EO57 connects with the EO12 in western Drama, and the Bulgarian II-19 road at the border.

== History ==
Ministerial Decision G25871 of 9 July 1963 created the EO57 from the old EO45, which existed by royal decree from 1955 until 1963, and followed the same route as the current EO57. Border controls with Bulgaria, at the northern end of the National Road, were abolished on 1 January 2025 when Bulgaria fully joined the Schengen Area.
