= Falakro =

Mountain in Drama, Greece

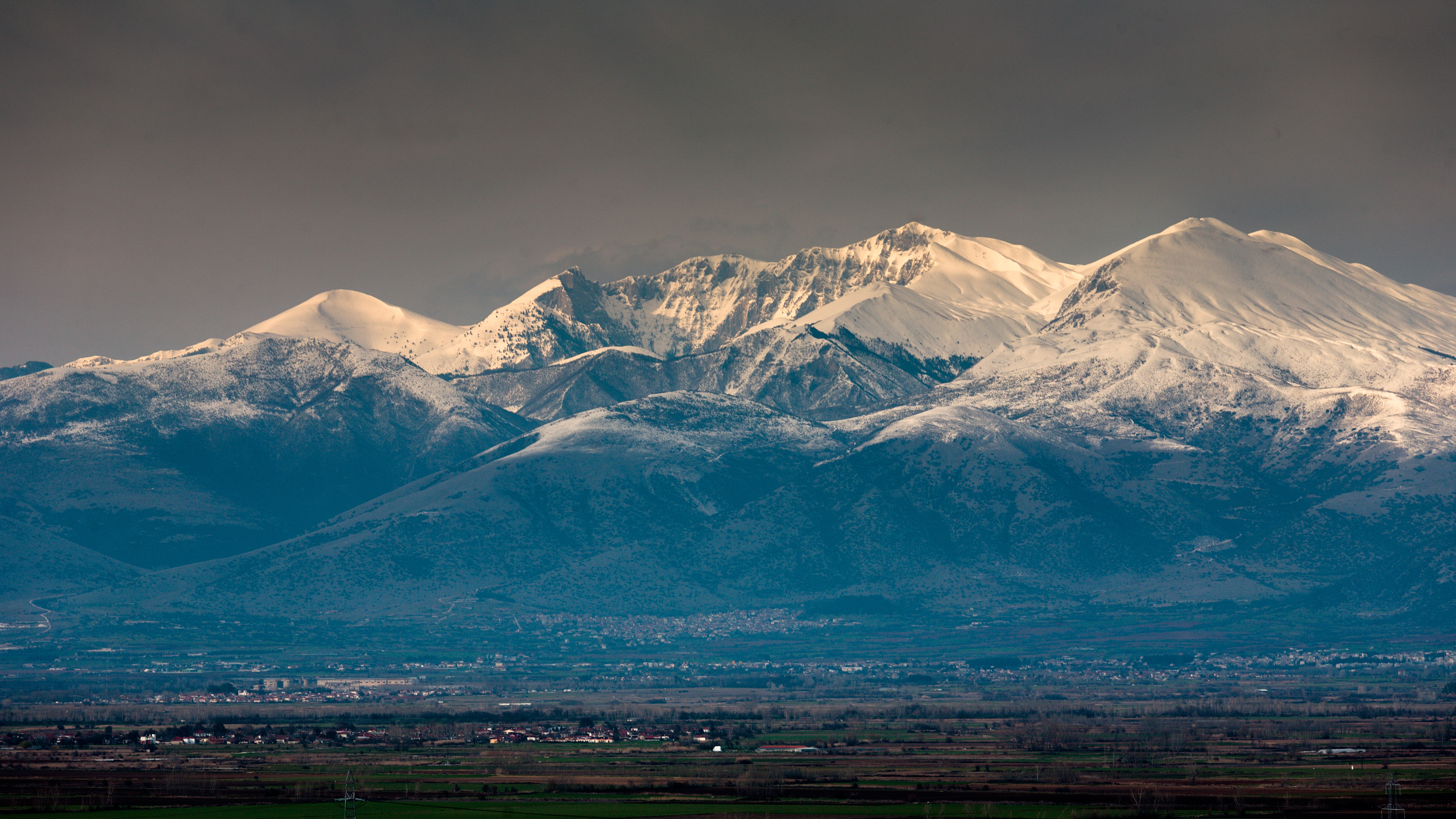
- Mount Falakro

Highest point
- Elevation: 2,232 m (7,323 ft)
- Prominence: 1,409 m (4,623 ft)
- Listing: Ribu
- Coordinates: 41°17′38″N 24°05′41″E

Geography
- Location within Greece
- Location: Drama (regional unit), Greece

Falakro Oros (Greek: Φαλακρό όρος, translated in English as "Bald mountain"; Bulgarian: Боздаг, Bozdag; Turkish: Bozdağ, translated in English as "Gray mountain") is a mountain in the Drama regional unit, in eastern Greek Macedonia, northern Greece. The elevation of its highest summit, Profitis Ilias, is 2,232 metres above sea level. There is a ski resort on the mountain.

A very small part of a low northern offshoot of Falakro extends into Bulgarian territory, just south of the village of Beslen in Blagoevgrad Province. The highest point that lies within Bulgaria is the forested peak Chiplakbair (1,090 metres high) on the border between the two countries.

== Gallery ==
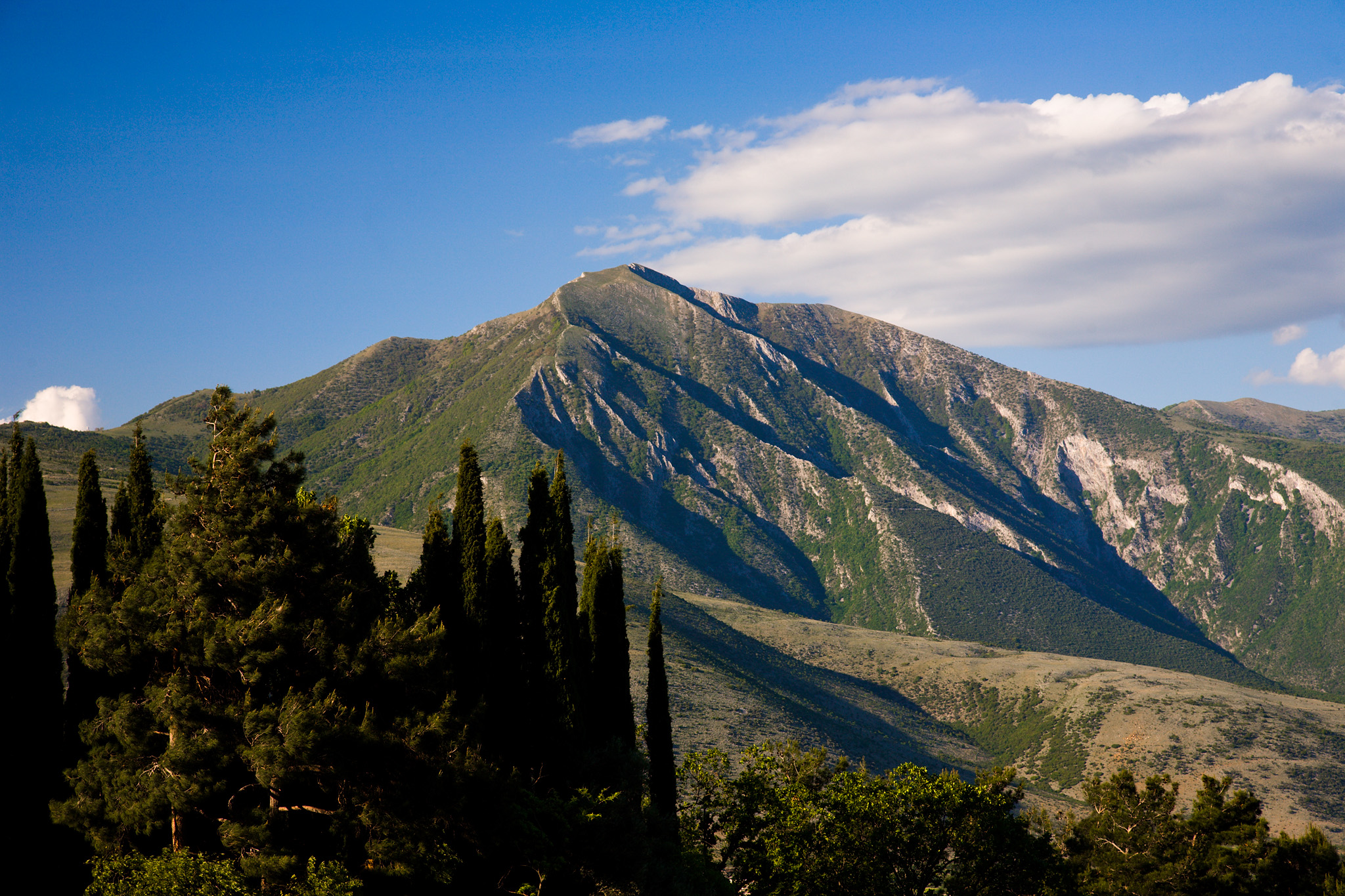
Agios Pavlos peak of Falakro

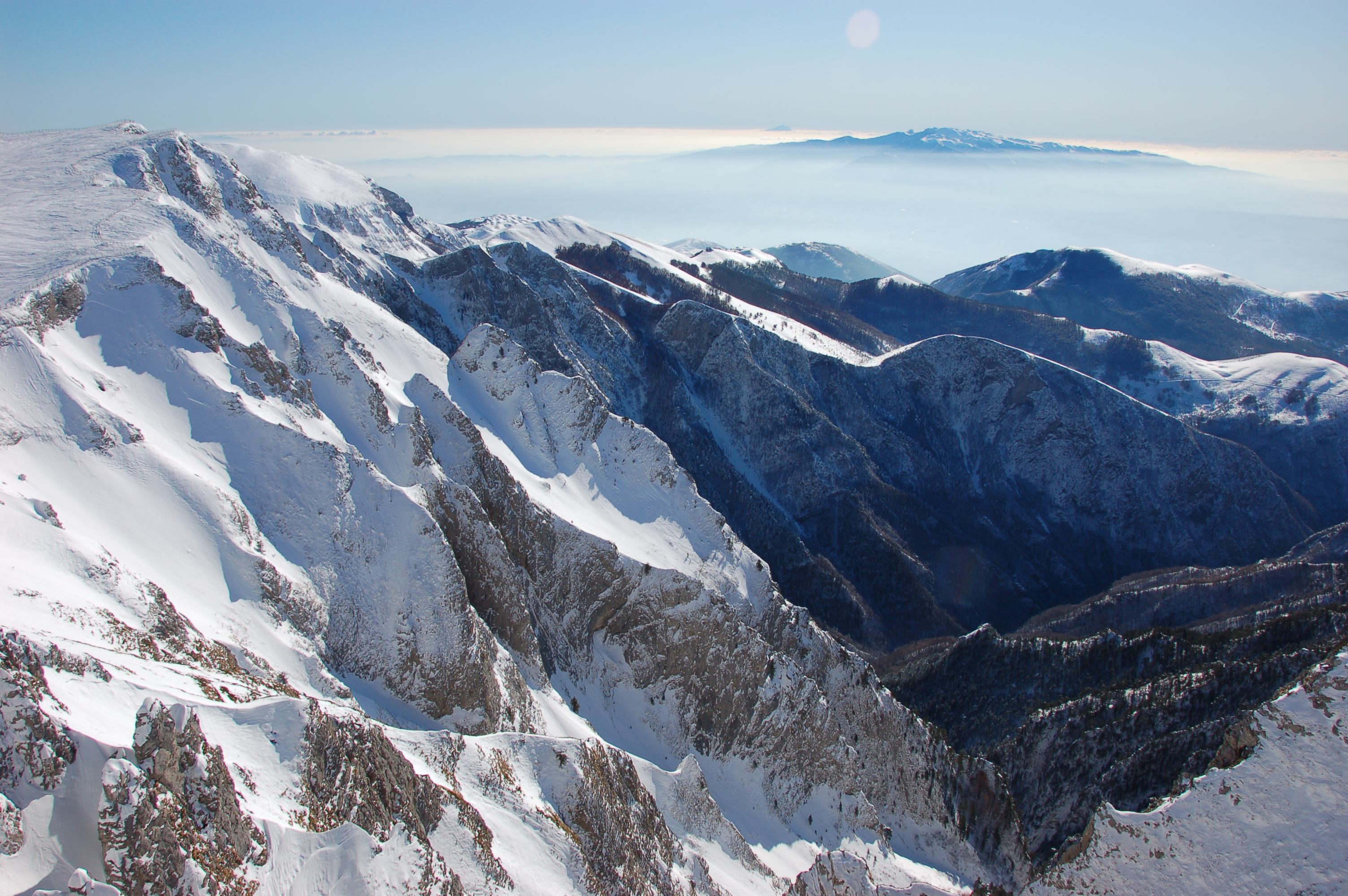
Peak

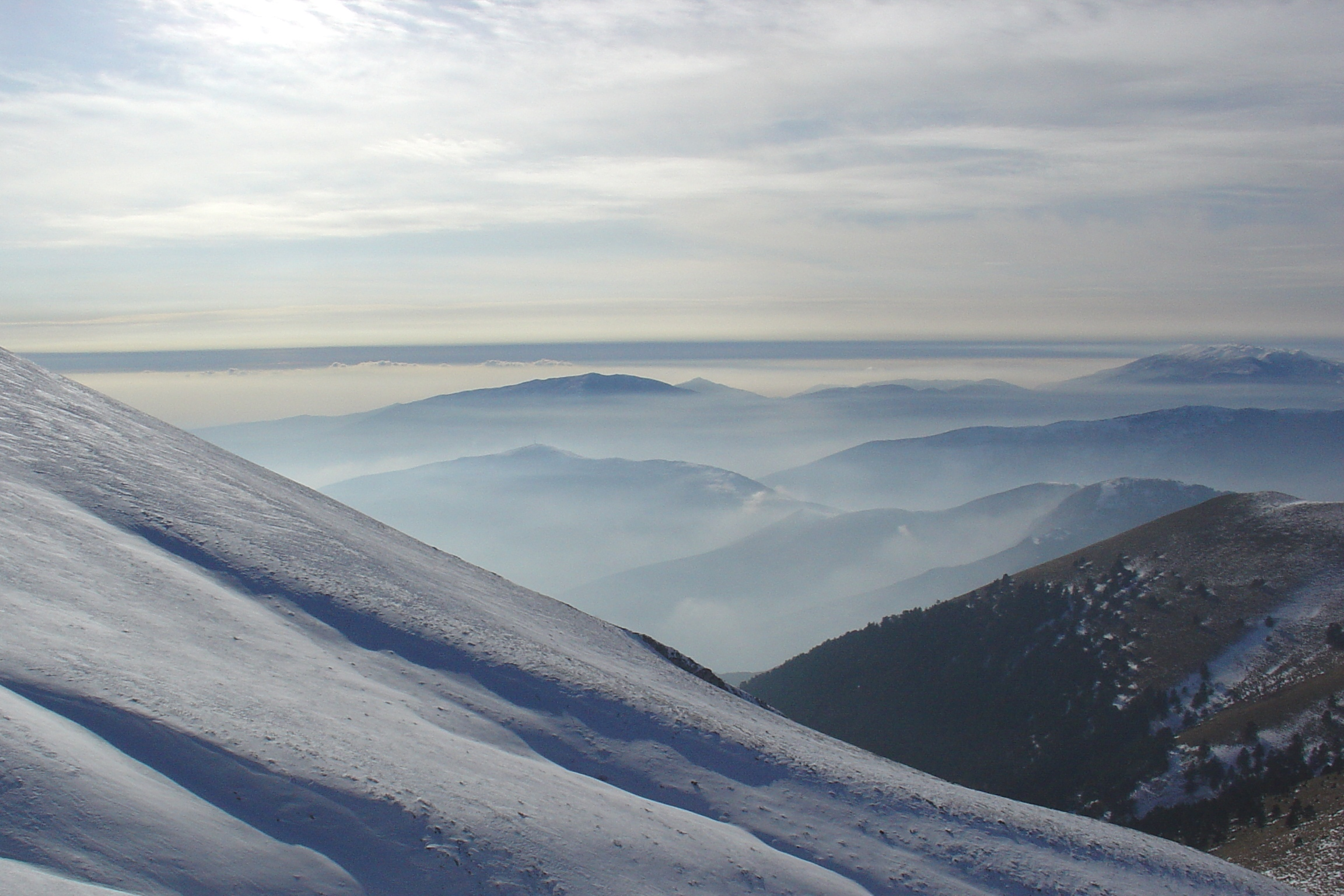
View from the top of Falakro

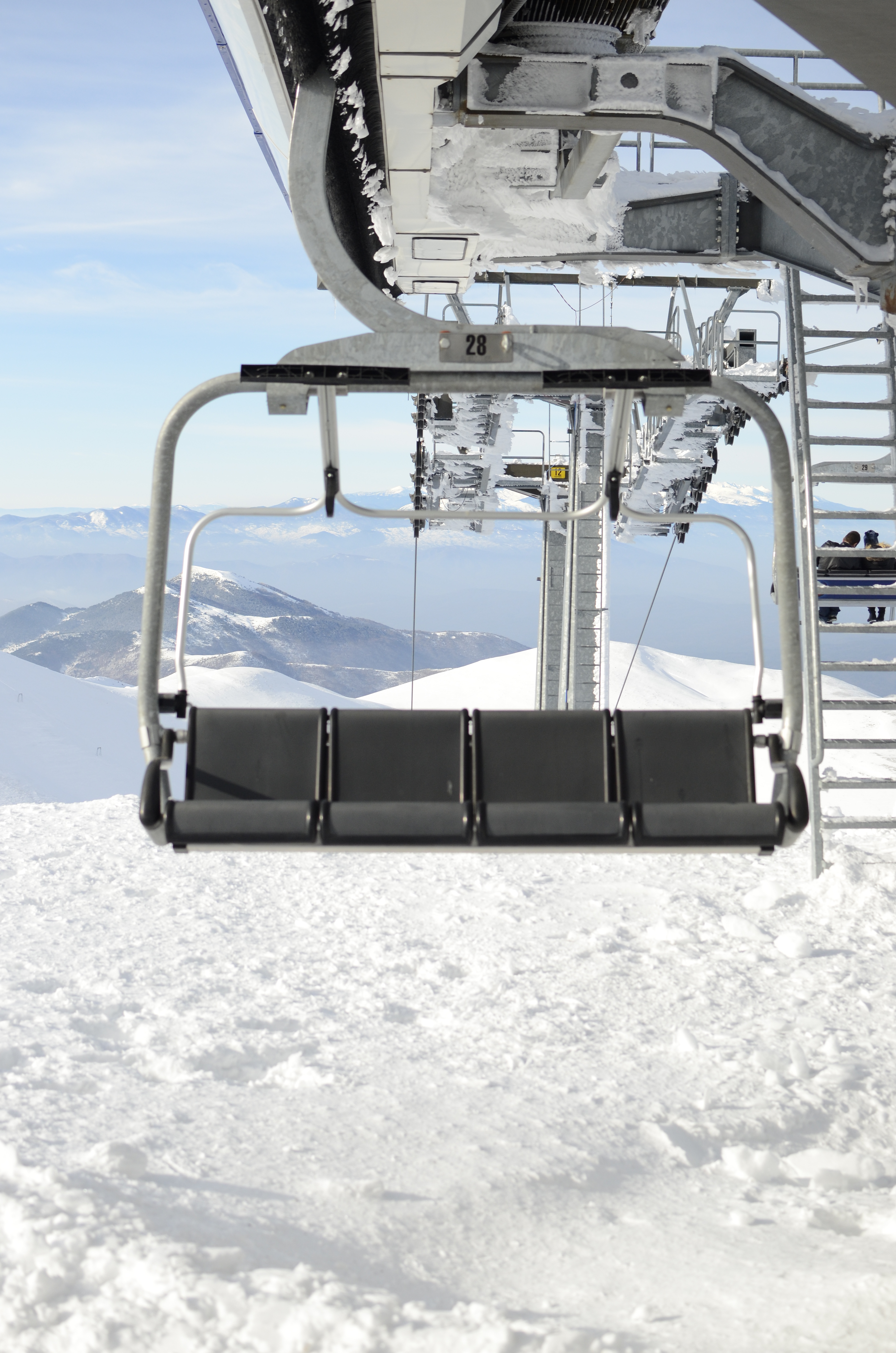
Lifts in ski resort on Mount Falakro near Drama. Apart from the ski track, the lifts end at a cafe-bar at an altitude of 2,111 m

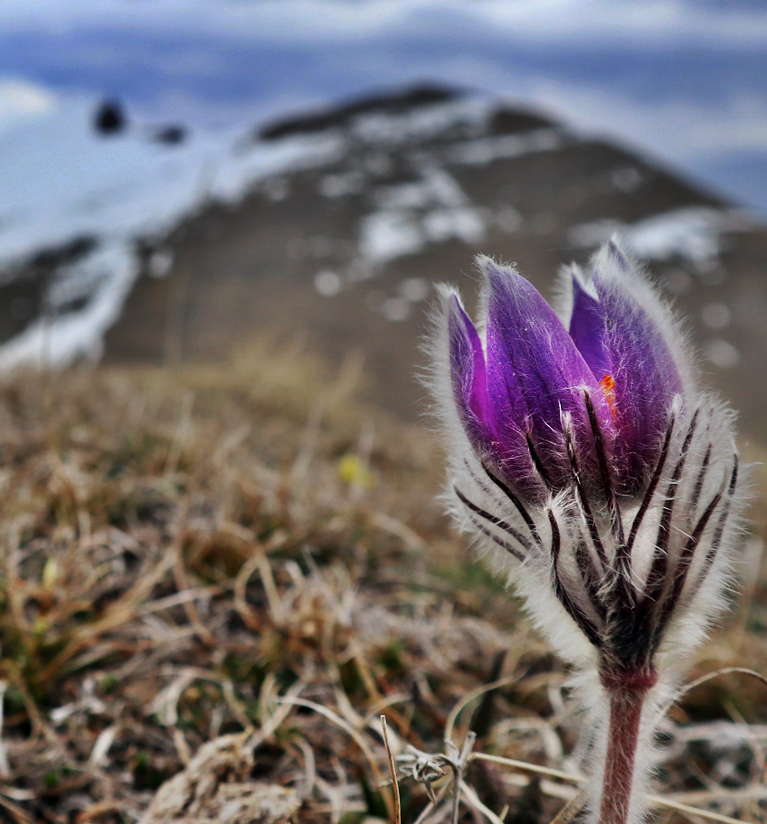
Pulsatilla flower on Mount Falakro
