= Koprivlen =

Koprivlen Копривлен
- Village
- Location within Bulgaria
- Coordinates: 41°31′N 23°48′E
- Country: Bulgaria
- Province: Blagoevgrad Province
- Municipality: Hadzhidimovo Municipality

Government
  - Mayor: Angel Zaikov (Ind.)

Area
  - Total: 27.734 km^{2} (10.708 sq mi)
- Elevation: 510 m (1,670 ft)

Population (2020)
  - Total: 1,315
- Time zone: UTC+2 (EET)
  - Summer (DST): UTC+3 (EEST)

Koprivlen is a village in Hadzhidimovo Municipality, in Blagoevgrad Province, Bulgaria.

== Geography ==
The village of Koprivlen is located at the foot of the eastern slopes of the Pirin mountains, in the southwestern part of the Republic of Bulgaria, 7 km south of the town of Gotse Delchev. To the northeast the land of the village reaches the Mesta riverbed, to the southeast it borders the lands of the village of Sadovo and the town of Hadzhidimovo, to the southwest with the land of the former Greek Muslim village of Lyalevo, and to the north with the villages of Novo Leski and Musomishta.

== History ==
Objects of the Thracian material culture were found in the Kozluka area. Near the village are preserved the remains of a fortress of rather large size, as well as a church building known to the local population as the "Monastery of St. George". During the Middle Ages, the area passed periodically into Bulgarian and into Byzantine rule. This is judged by a church building west of the village and ancient coins of Bulgarian and Byzantine origin, statuettes, remains of pottery and others.

A list from 1666 for the tax paid to the Ottoman Empire by the Christian population shows that Koprivlen has 23 families.

In the "Ethnography of the Provinces of Adrianople, Monastir and Thessaloniki", published in Istanbul in 1878 and reflecting the statistics of the male population from 1873, Koprivlian is listed as a village with 50 households with 60 Muslims and 80 Bulgarians. In 1889, Stefan Verkovic (Topographic and Ethnographic Essay of Macedonia) noted Koprivljan as a village with 22 Bulgarian and 28 Turkish houses.

In 1891 Georgi Strezov wrote about the village:

"Koprivlen, a village two hours south of the city (Nevrokop). It is located on a flat land; the road from Nevrokop to Ser passes through it. (Most of the inhabitants are) exclusively farmers; good watermelons come out. 50 Turkish houses. Until recently, there were up to 30 Bulgarian houses that were forced to flee by Turkish population. [3] “

In the last quarter of the 19th century, the Christian population left the village and Koprivlen turned to a settlement with only a Turkish population. By 1900, according to the famous statistics of Vasil Kanchov ("Macedonia. Ethnography and Statistics"), the population of the village numbered 340 people, all Turks.

The Balkan War in 1912 changed the ethnic composition of the village - the Turks abandoned the village and in their place came the first settlers from Libyahovo and from 18 other Bulgarian settlements left on Greek territory. The settlement process took place at different speeds in the 1920s and 1930s. Statistical data from the period after the liberation of the Pirin region show that Koprivlen is among those settlements whose inhabitants are constantly growing. When the first census was made in 1920, a total of 567 people lived in the village. Subsequent censuses registered 892 people (1926), 1207 people (1934), 1671 people in 1946, and with little difference since then, the population is still close.

== Economy, transportation ==
The Village is situated on the international secondary road № 19 between Gotse Delchev to Serres in Greece. There are busses, connecting the village with Hadzhidimovo, Gotse Delchev, Blagoevgrad and Sofia. There aren't other types of transportation.

Agriculture is the main source of income in Koprivlen. There are also some industrial subjects - a marble processing factory and a transportation company.

There is a hotel and a guesthouse, working all seasons.

A general practitioner is providing medical services. The closest hospital is in the town of Gotse Delchev.

There is a post office. Mobile telephony from all Bulgarian providers is available.

== Education ==
There is a primary school "Nicola Vaptsarov" for students from 1st to 7th grade.

The education in the village of Koprivlen is linked with development of the village. At the beginning of the XX century the ethnic character of the village changed, from predominantly Turkish to predominantly Bulgarian. In 1918 an elementary school was founded in a small building, which until then had served as a cafe and two classrooms were established. The construction of the current school began in 1927 and was fully completed in its current form in 1935. In the nearly 100 years of development of education in Koprivlen the school is withstands the turbulent political events of the twentieth century.

There is a functional kindergarten "Nezabravka" for children in preschool age.

The community centre "Vazrazhdane" is founded in 1927 year with a folk ensemble, an orchestra, a dance ensemble and a library with 11 905 books.

== Religion ==
The population in Koprivlen is Orthodox Christian. The construction of the church began on May 11, 1992. The Church of the Assumption of the Blessed Virgin Mary was built from June 24, 1992 to 1994. It is 15 m wide and 33 m long. The dome is 17 m high. The bell weighs 214 kg and is a gift from the Drama Regional Governor Costas Efimeridis - born in the village of Vazem (In Koprivlen there are 25 families from Vazem). The church was consecrated by Metropolitan Nathaniel of Nevrokop (secular name Iliya Kalaydzhiev - born in 1952 in the village of Koprivlen) and Plovdiv Metropolitan Arseniy on October 1. Since 1996 1.10. becomes "Day of Koprivlen" with an annual fair.

The monastery “St. Georgi ”was built from May 29, 1995 to May 6, 1997 on the site of an old monastery with the same name, under the direction of priest Atanas Zlatev. It is 10 m wide, 16 m long, 13 m high. It was consecrated in 1997 by Metropolitan Nathaniel of Nevrokop.
