= Teplen =

- Village
- Location within Bulgaria
- Coordinates: 41°29′N 23°56′E
- Country: Bulgaria
- Province: Blagoevgrad Province
- Municipality: Hadzhidimovo Municipality

Government
  - Mayor: Zhivko Petelov (DPS)

Area
  - Total: 1,316 km^{2} (508 sq mi)
- Elevation: 792 m (2,598 ft)

Population (2022)
  - Total: 458
- Time zone: UTC+2 (EET)
  - Summer (DST): UTC+3 (EEST)

Teplen is a village in Hadzhidimovo Municipality, in Blagoevgrad Province, Bulgaria.

== Geography ==
The village of Teplen is located in a mountainous area in Southwestern Bulgaria. It is situated on the Beslensky hill. The highest point in its territory is Teplenski peak - 980 meters, located on the very border with Greece at border pyramid number 146.

== History ==
In an Ottoman tax register for the Western Rhodopes from 1499 - 1502, it is mentioned that the population of the village was already Muslim.

In the list of settlements with registered names of the heads of households in the second half of the 15th and the beginning of the 16th century, 78 persons were registered in the village of Teplen (Papa Valkan).

In the 19th century, Teplen was a Muslim village in Nevrokop (the old name of the town of Gotse Delchev) kaza of the Ottoman Empire. In the "Ethnography of the vilayets of Adrianople, Monastir and Salonica", published in Constantinople in 1878 and reflecting the statistics of the male population of 1873, Téplen is listed as a village with 45 households and 130 Pomac inhabitants. According to Vasil Kanchov's statistics ("Macedonia. Ethnography and Statistics"), in 1900 Teplen was a Bulgarian-Mohammedan settlement. 360 people live in it, all Mohammedan Bulgarians in 135 houses. According to Stefan Verković, at the end of the 19th century Teplen had a Muslim male population of 156 people living in 45 houses.

== Religion ==
The village is Muslim and there is a mosque.
