= Sadovo, Blagoevgrad Province =

Sadovo
- Village
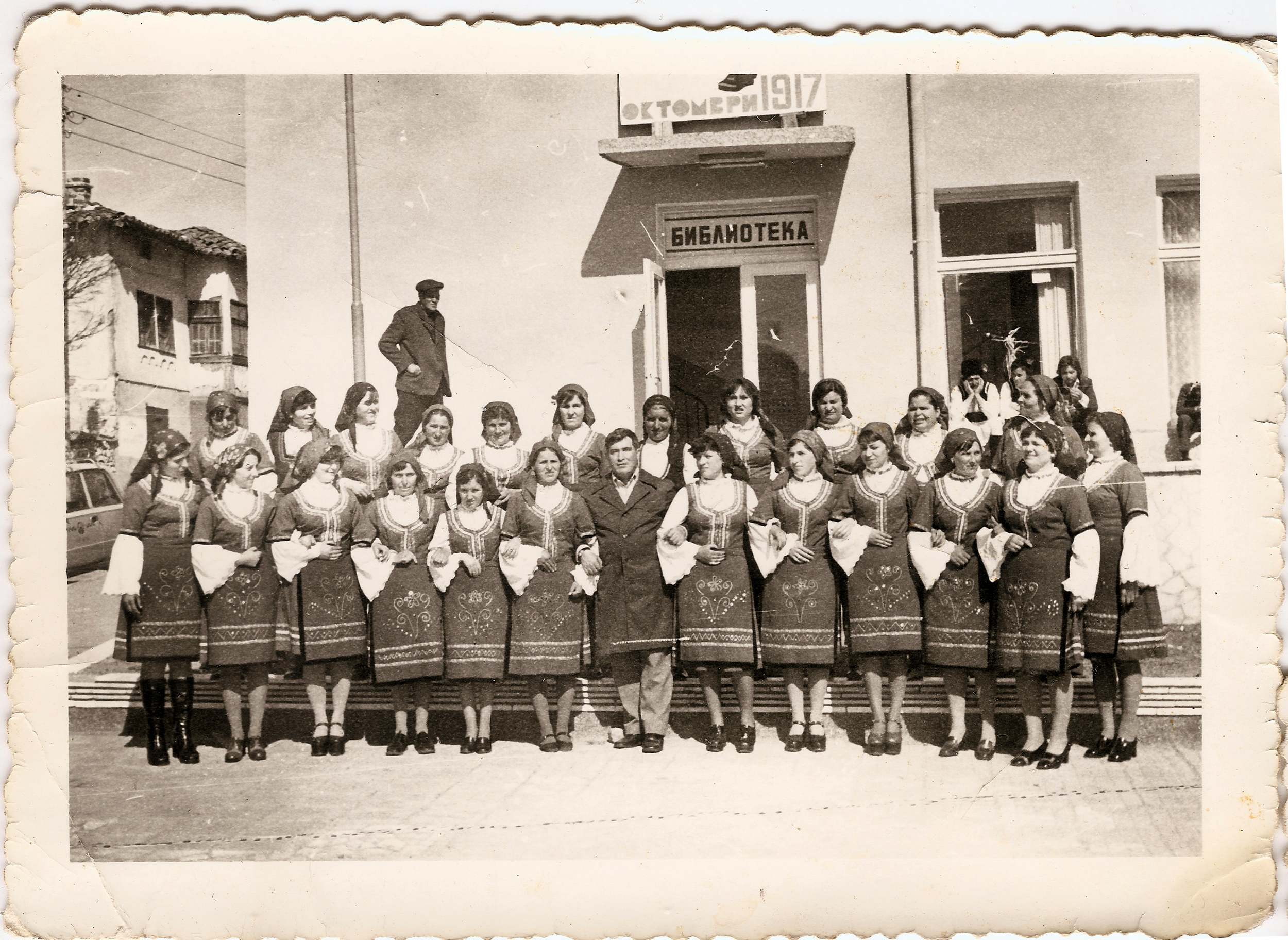
- Folk ensemble of Sadovo in front of the reading house, Koprivlen

- Location within Bulgaria
- Coordinates: 41°30′N 23°49′E
- Country: Bulgaria
- Province: Blagoevgrad Province
- Municipality: Hadzhidimovo Municipality

Government
  - Mayor: Georgi Paraskov (NDSV)

Area
  - Total: 11.718 km^{2} (4.524 sq mi)
- Elevation: 559 m (1,834 ft)

Population (2022)
  - Total: 379
- Time zone: UTC+2 (EET)
  - Summer (DST): UTC+3 (EEST)

Sadovo is a village in Hadzhidimovo Municipality, in Blagoevgrad Province, Bulgaria.

== Geography ==
The village is located in southwestern Bulgaria in terrain 5 kilometers west of the municipal center Hadzhidimovo and 5 kilometers north of the border with Greece. It is situated along the secondary international road between Gotse Delchev and Drama.

== History ==
From an Ottoman register of 1478, it is clear that at that year 116 non-Muslim households lived in Sadovo, 12 of Turkmen-Muslims and 9 newly converted to Islam.

The Church of Saint Paraskeva dates from 1863. In the book Ethnography of the vilayets of Adrianople, Monastir and Thessalonik, published in Constantinople in 1878 and reflecting the statistics of the male population from 1873, Sadovo is listed as a village with 78 households and 65 Muslim inhabitants and 200 Bulgarians. In 1889, Stefan Verkovich (Topographical-Ethnographic Sketch of Macedonia) noted Sadovo as a village with 44 Bulgarian and 24 Turkish houses

In 1891, Georgi Strezov wrote about the village: Sadovo, 2 hours SW of Nevrokop (the town of Gotse Delchev). Built next to a kendik hill. All around a fertile plain. In the church they read mixed. Mixed school, with 15 students. 65 houses; 20 Turks and 56 Bulgarians."

By 1900, according to the famous statistics of Vasil Kanchov ("Macedonia. Ethnography and Statistics"), the population of the village numbered 401 people, of which 288 were Christian Bulgarians and 113 were Turks.

The village is inhabited by local Bulgarians and descendants of refugees from Aegean Macedonia and more precisely from the area of today's villages Kato Nevrokopi (Zarnevo) and Kato Vrontou (Dolno Brodi). It is the last village on the Bulgarian side before the border crossing Ilinden - Exochi (Vazem).
