= Teshovo =

Coordinates: 41°28′N 23°42′E

- Village
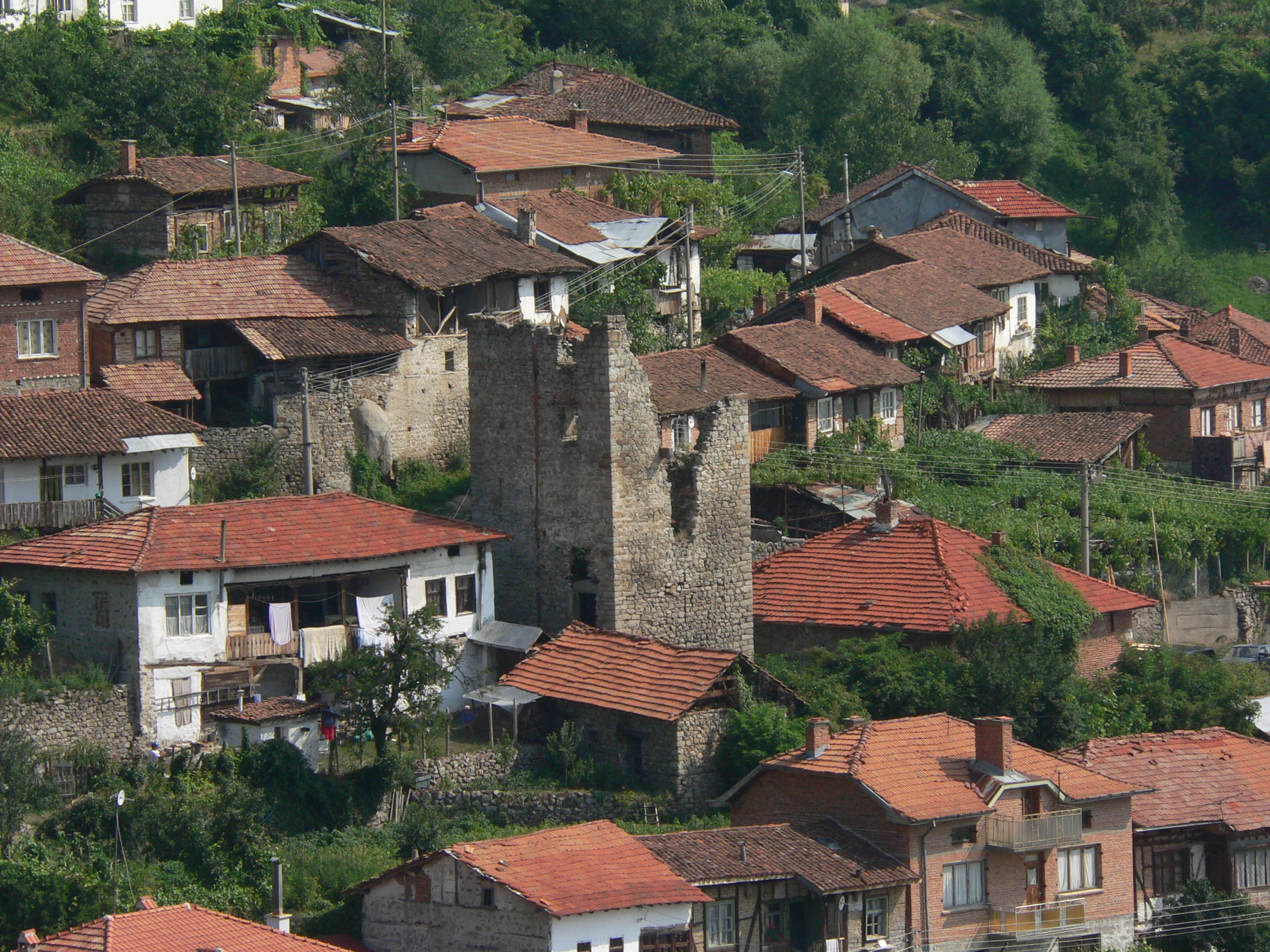
- Early Ottoman tower house (kula) in Teshovo
- Interactive map of Teshovo
- Country: Bulgaria
- Province: Blagoevgrad Province
- Municipality: Hadzhidimovo Municipality
- Time zone: UTC+2 (EET)
  - Summer (DST): UTC+3 (EEST)

Teshovo is a village in Hadzhidimovo Municipality, in Blagoevgrad Province, Bulgaria.
