= Simitli =

Simitli Симитли
- Town
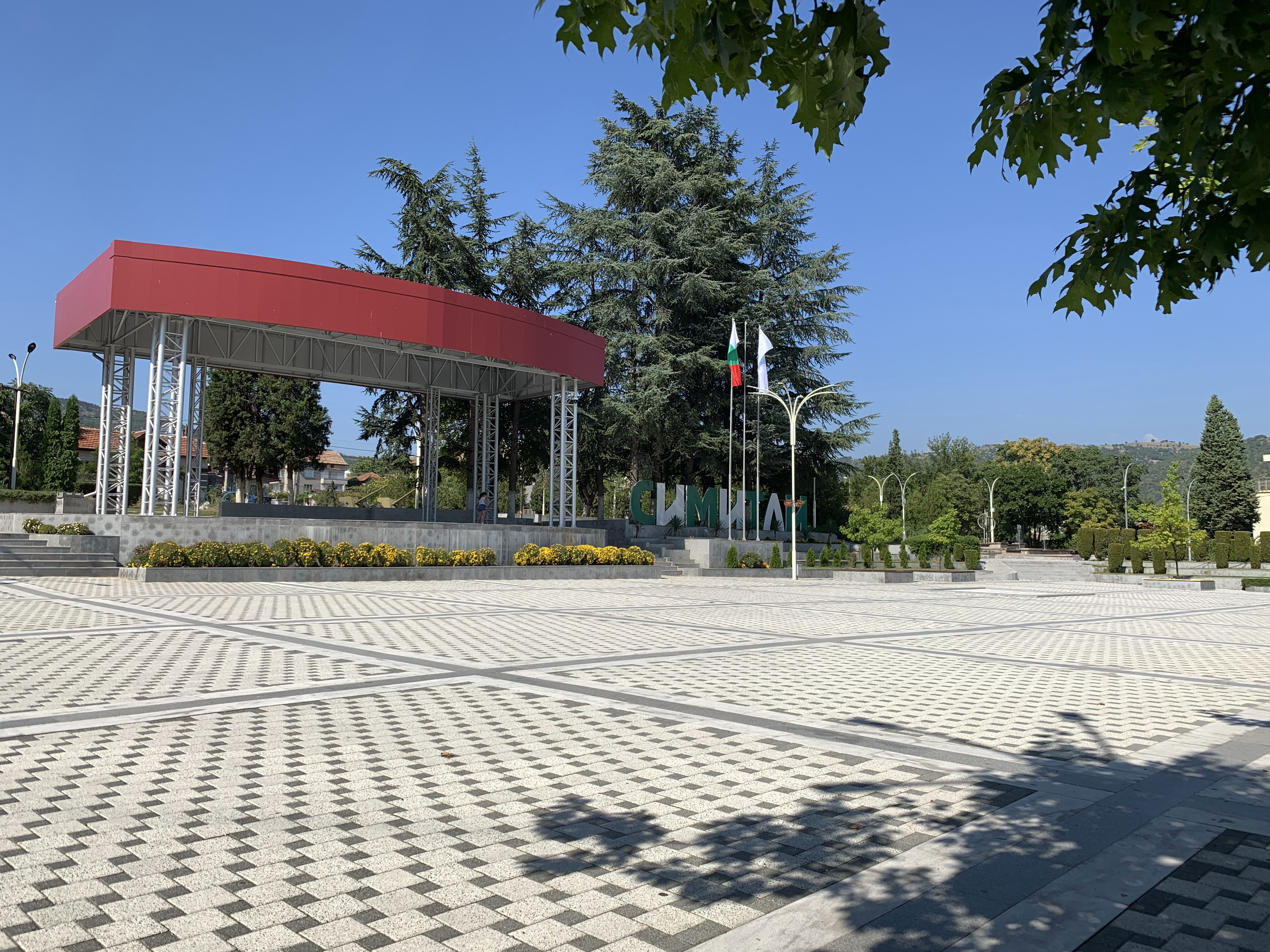

- Location of Simitli
- Coordinates: 41°53′N 23°7′E
- Country: Bulgaria
- Provinces (Oblast): Blagoevgrad

Government
  - Mayor: Apostol Apostolov
- Elevation: 323 m (1,060 ft)

Population (2005-09-13)
  - Total: 7,454
- Time zone: UTC+2 (EET)
  - Summer (DST): UTC+3 (EEST)
- Postal Code: 2730
- Area code: 0748
- Vehicle registration: E

Simitli (Bulgarian: Симитли [simitˈli]) also known as Simitliya (Bulgarian: Симитлия), is a town in Blagoevgrad Province in southwestern Bulgaria. It has a population of 7,454 and is located 17 km south of Blagoevgrad. It is the seat of Simitli Municipality.

== Geography ==
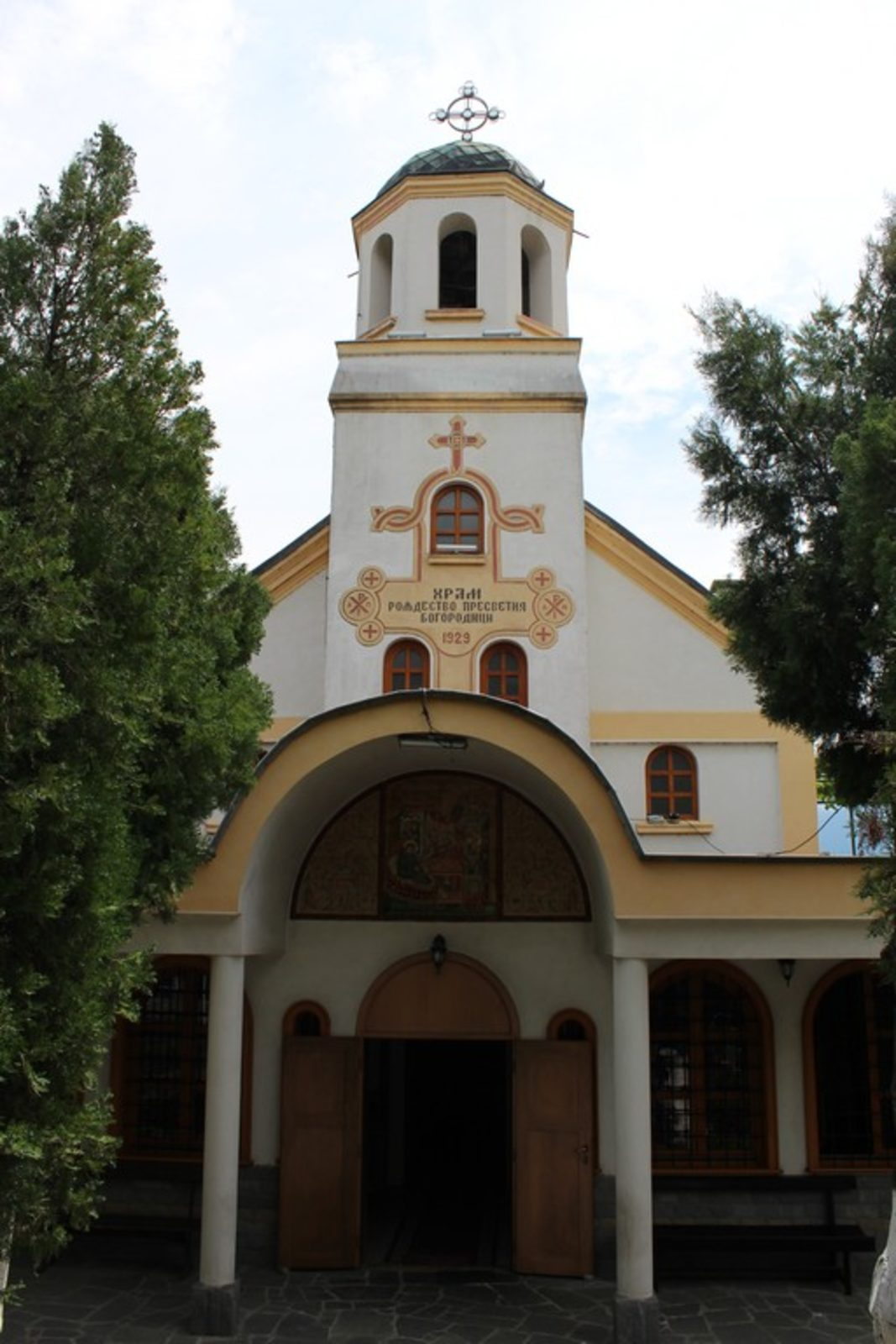
Church of the Dormition of the Mother of God

The town is located in the Simitli Valley at the foothills of the Rila, Pirin, and Vlahina mountain ranges. Simitli is on both banks of the river Struma, at the confluence with its tributary the Gradevska reka. Geographical locations of note are the Komatinski Cliffs between Brestovo and Sushitsa, the Kresna Gorge along the Struma, and the foothills of the Pirin Mountains at Senokos.

== Transportation ==
Simitli lies along the parallel Struma motorway and first class I-1 road along the Struma valley, part of European route E79, that link the capital Sofia and the provincial centre Blagoevgrad with Greece at Kulata. At Simitli the second class II-19 road branches off I-1 heading to the town and winter resort of Bansko in the Razlog Valley. Simitli is also part of the Bulgarian State Railways network from Sofia to Greece.

== Tourism ==
Some of the best whitewater rapids in the Balkans can be found on the Struma river in the Kresna Gorge. The rafting and kayaking season is from April to July and there is guided rafting every weekend. Simitli is also part of the EuroCup circuit for the European Rafting Federation every year. Every second weekend of January, there is a Kukeri or Surva festival held in the local stadium by E-79 which rivals Razlog and Pernik's own Kukeri Festivals.
