= Konstantin Zhostov =

Bulgarian general

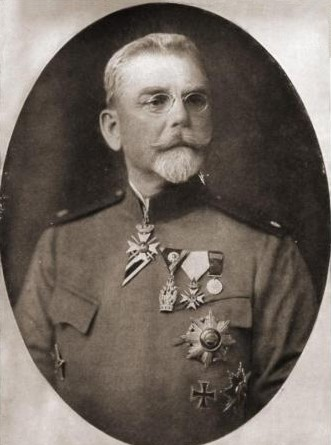
- Born: 30 September 1867; Gaytaninovo, Ottoman Empire
- Died: 30 August 1916 (aged 48); Kyustendil, Bulgaria
- Military career
- Allegiance: Bulgaria
- Branch: Bulgarian Army
- Service years: 1885–1916
- Rank: Major General
- Commands: Eight Tundzha Infantry Division; Chief of Staff of the Third Army; Chief of the General Staff of the Bulgarian Army
- Conflicts: First Balkan War; Second Balkan War; First World War
- Awards

Konstantin Andonov Zhostov (Bulgarian: Константин Андонов Жостов) (30 September 1867 – 30 August 1916) was a Bulgarian general and Chief of the Bulgarian Army Staff.

== Biography ==
Konstantin Zhostov was born in the village of Gaytaninovo, at the time part of the Ottoman Empire. He was the son of Andon Zhostov, a teacher and a significant figure in the struggle for the autonomy of the Bulgarian Church. Konstantin had two brothers.

After the Russo-Turkish War (1877-1878) the family settled in Sofia and Andon became a priest. During the Serbo-Bulgarian War Konstantin was a student in Lom and took part in the Battle of Pirot between 14 and 15 November 1885 as a volunteer in the Student's Legion.

After the war, he graduated from the High School and Lom and continued his education in the Artillery Department of the Military School in Sofia. He received his first officer rank - lieutenant on 9 May 1887 and began his service in the artillery and in 1894 was promoted to captain.

In 1889 Zhostov went to Vienna, where he entered the Artillery School to study for a staff officer. In 1897 he graduated with excellent marks and returned to Bulgaria and was assigned to the administration of the Army's General Staff. Latter he was appointed commander of an artillery battery in the 3rd Artillery Regiment and was made head of the fortress artillery section in the Artillery Department of the War Ministry.

In 1902 he was promoted to major and in 1905 was sent as a military attaché to Vienna. In 1908 Zhostov was promoted to colonel and took command of the 8th Tundzha Infantry Division. Then in 1906-1907 he was again a military attaché in Saint Petersburg and Paris. After his return to Bulgaria he became part of Tsar Ferdinand's retinue. In 1910 Konstantin was made commander of the 3rd Artillery Regiment and in 1912 became head of the Reserve Officer School.

=== Balkan Wars ===
When the general mobilization prior the First Balkan War was declared in September 1912 Konstantin Zhostov was appointed Chief of Staff of the 3rd Army and as such was at the heart of the Bulgarian victories at Lozengrad and Lüleburgaz. Latter he was Chief of Staff of the United Bulgarian 1st and 3rd Armies. After the first armistice was concluded, he was included in the Bulgarian delegation at the London peace talks. With the failure of the talks he returned to the front and assumed his previous post. After a few months of fighting the Ottoman Empire was finally defeated and the London Peace Treaty was signed on 30 May 1913.

During the Second Balkan War he was commander of the 1st Brigade of the 7th Infantry Division.

=== First World War ===
On the 15 August 1915 Zhostov was promoted to major general and in September appointed Chief of the General Staff of the Army. He had a leading role during the Serbian Campaign and in the Macedonian front. Still, the general was not among the strong supporters of the Central Powers. Following a tour of the Western Front and the Italian Front he even suggested to the prime minister Radoslavov that Bulgaria switch sides and join the Entente. Such views made Zhostov, in his own words, a "black cat" for Tsar Ferdinand and the government.

Major General Konstantin Zhostov died on 30 August 1916 after suffering from complications of appendicitis.

== Awards ==
- Order of Bravery, II grade and III grade,2 class
- Order of St Alexander, II and III grade with swords
- Order of Military Merit, IV and V grade
- German Iron Cross
- Austrian Order of the Iron Crown
- Ottoman Liyakat Medal

Military offices
Preceded by Kliment Boyadzhiev	Chief of the General Staff; 1915–1916	Succeeded by Ivan Lukov
