= Novo Leski =

- Village
- Location within Bulgaria
- Coordinates: 41°32′N 23°45′E
- Country: Bulgaria
- Province: Blagoevgrad Province
- Municipality: Hadzhidimovo Municipality

Government
  - Mayor: Georgi Vankalov (DPS)

Area
  - Total: 13.546 km^{2} (5.230 sq mi)
- Elevation: 850 m (2,790 ft)

Population (2019)
  - Total: 376
- Time zone: UTC+2 (EET)
  - Summer (DST): UTC+3 (EEST)

Novo Leski is a village in Hadzhidimovo Municipality, in Blagoevgrad Province, Bulgaria.

== Geography ==
The village is situated in the foothills of the Pirin Mountain in the valley of the Mesta River on the secondary international road between Gotse Delchev and Drama, Greece, 6 km west north-west of the town of Hadzhidimovo.

== History ==
The old village named Lyaski was located in the folds of Pirin, but in search of more fertile land, the village moved 2 kilometres to the east, in the valley of the Mesta river in 1927. Its current name means New Leski.

In the "Ethnography of the Provinces of Adrianople, Monastir and Thessaloniki", published in Istanbul in 1878 and reflecting the statistics of the male population from 1873, Lyaski is listed as a village with 75 households and 260 Bulgarian inhabitants. In 1889, Stefan Verkovic ("Topographical and Ethnographic Essay of Macedonia") noted Lyaski as a village with 72 Bulgarian houses. The Church of St. George in the village dates back to the beginning of the 19th century.

In 1891 Georgi Strezov wrote about the village:

"Lyaski, a village on the left bank of Toplitsa. It is 1 1/4 hours from Nevrokop. Fertile land in everything. Butchers in Nevrokop. Church "St. Georgi ”; Mass is said in Bulgarian and in Greek. Houses 195 Bulgarians. “

According to the statistics of Vasil Kanchov ("Macedonia. Ethnography and Statistics") at the end of the 19th century Lyaski had a population of 695, all Bulgarian Christians.

In a report to Ilarion Nevrokopski from 1909 he wrote about the village:

"Lyaski ... The old village is located in an ancient place in a ravine. Near the village there is an oak forest. The village has 186 Bulgarian houses. The population is engaged in agriculture and livestock breeding. Farmers work in the fields almost all summer. The fields are more Turkish. Some of the villagers work in Serres, Kavala, Drama, Greece. About 20 carpenters go to Bulgaria every year. People are poor, but hardworking and capable. The church "St. Georgi ”was built in 1844. The school is next to the church.

At the outbreak of the Balkan War in 1912, thirteen people from Lyaski volunteered for the Macedonian-Edirne voluntary militia .

== Economy and transportation ==
Agriculture and livestock breeding are the main sources of income in the village. Its situation on an international road is favourable for roadside businesses like stores and cafes.

There is a paper packaging facrory, owned by German investors.

Novo Leski is connected by secondary road № 19 with Gotse Delchev, Razlog and Sofia as well with the Greek towns Drama and Kavala and busses to Sofia and Blagoevgrad during all the day.

There are no educational institutions in the village. An elementary school named "Hristo Botev" was closed in 2009 year.

== Religion ==
The inhabitants are Orthodox Christians. The old church "St. George" is built in 1844 in the old village and is the only remaining building there. The church is restored and functional. In 1994 a church "St. Demetrius" has been built in the new village. There are also two chapels west of Novo Leski - "St. Marina" and "St. Elijah"
