= Beslen =

Beslen Беслен
- Village
- Location within Bulgaria
- Coordinates: 41°28′N 23°58′E
- Country: Bulgaria
- Province: Blagoevgrad Province
- Municipality: Hadzhidimovo Municipality

Government
  - Mayor: Rosen Chapkanov (GERB)

Area
  - Total: 19.466 km^{2} (7.516 sq mi)

Population (2018-12-31)
  - Total: 665
- Time zone: UTC+2 (EET)
  - Summer (DST): UTC+3 (EEST)

Beslen (Bulgarian: Беслен) is a village in Hadzhidimovo Municipality, in Blagoevgrad Province, Bulgaria. It is situated just 2 km from the border with Greece.

== Geography ==
The village is situated on the Beslen ridge of the Rhodope Mountains in the most southeastern part of the Hadzhidimovo municipality, 10 km southeast of the town of Hadzhidimovo, 94 km southeast of Blagoevgrad and 145 km south-southeast of Sofia. The terrain is mountainous. The climate is transitional Mediterranean with mountain influence with summer minimum and winter maximum of rainfalls.

== History ==
In the 19th century, Beslen was a Muslim village in the Nevrokop kaza of the Ottoman Empire. In the book "Ethnography of the vilayets of Adrianople, Monastir and Thessaloniki, published in Istanbul in 1878 and reflecting the male population statistics of 1873, Boslen is referred to as a village with 28 households and 75 Pomak inhabitants.

According to Stefan Verkovich, by the end of the 19th century, Beslen had a Muslim male population of 110, living in 28 houses. In 1899 the village had a population of 307 inhabitants according to the results of the census of the population of the Ottoman Empire. According to statistics by Vasil Kanchov ("Macedonia. Ethnography and Statistics") by 1900 Beslen (Baslen) is a Bulgarian-Muslim settlement. It is home to 300 Muslims in 35 houses.

The population is growing from natural growth. There is a slight decrease in the numbers after the migration abroad after 1989 year and the second decade of the 21st century.

- 1934 – 366 people;
- 1946 – 487 people;
- 1956 – 560 people;
- 1965 – 599 people;
- 1975 – 653 people;
- 1985 – 757 people;
- 1992 – 737 people;
- 2001 – 748 people;
- 2011 – 723 people;
- 2018 – 665 people;

== Economy and transportation ==
The agriculture is characterized by animal husbandry and crop production - growing tobacco. There is a cadastral and regulatory plan. The housing fund has been completely renovated. The massive stone walls on both floors and the attic furnaces are typical. The village is electrified, water-supplied, with sewage; much of the street network is paved with asphalt. The village is accessible only by road. It is connected with Hadzhidimovo by bus. There is a postal station. The village is provided with land lines and mobile service.

== Education ==
There is a middle school "Gotse Delchev", founded in 1927 as a primary school. It moved to a new building in 1960 and in 1980 it became a middle school. There is also a community centre "Hristo Botev".

== Religion ==
The population is predominantly Muslim. There is a mosque in the village.

== Honours ==
Beslen Island in Antarctica is named after the village of Beslen
