= Hadzhidimovo Municipality =

Hadzhidimovo Municipality Община Хаджидимово
- Municipality (Obshtina)
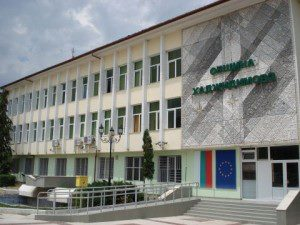

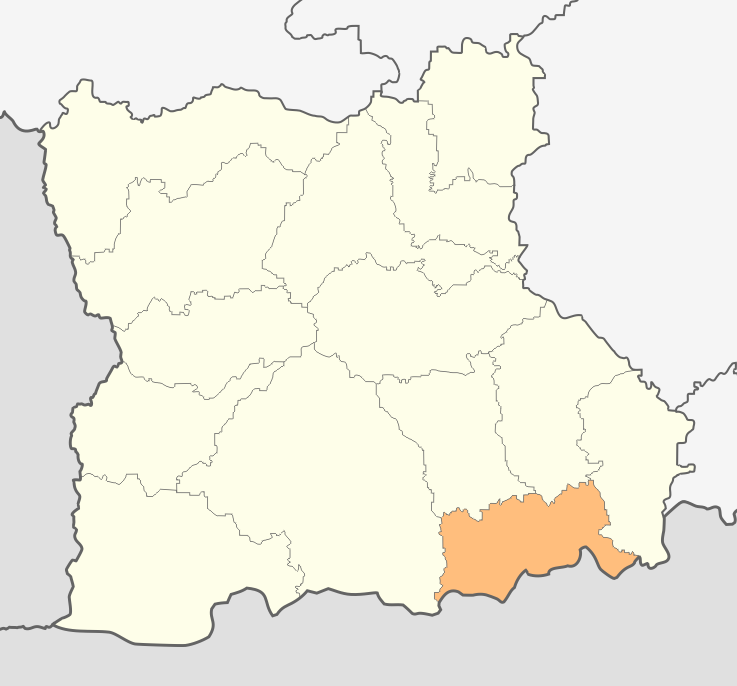
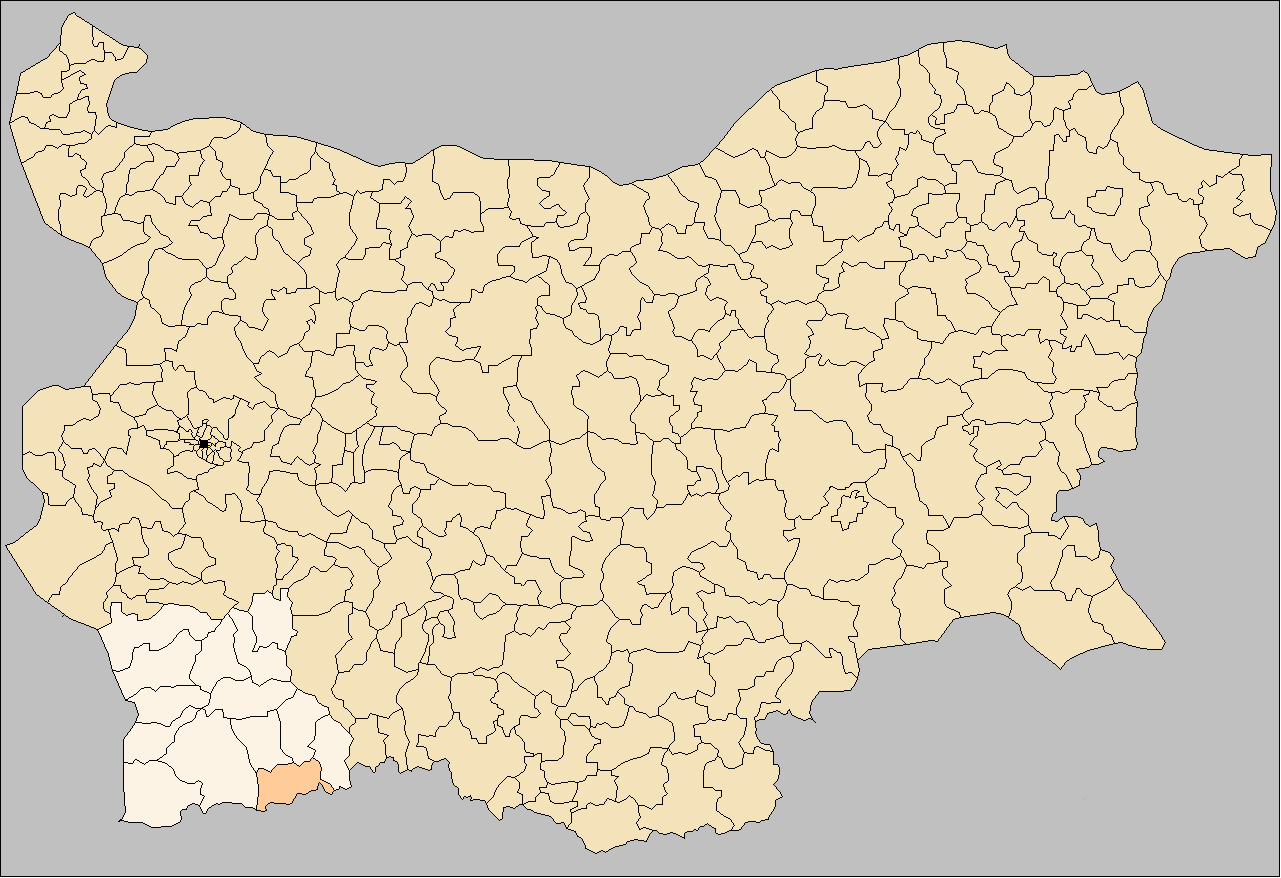
- Location in Blagoevgrad province Location on map of Bulgaria
- Coordinates: 41°31′N 23°52′E
- Country: Bulgaria
- Province (Oblast): Blagoevgrad
- Seat: Hadzhidimovo

Government
  - Mayor: Lyudmil Terziev (NDSV)

Area
  - Total: 327.78 km^{2} (126.56 sq mi)

Population (2011)NSI
  - Total: 10,091
  - Density: 31/km^{2} (80/sq mi)
- Time zone: UTC+2 (EET)
  - Summer (DST): UTC+3 (EEST)
- Website: hadzhidimovo.com

Hadzhidimovo Municipality (Bulgarian: Община Хаджидимово, Obshtina Hadzhidimovo) is situated in the southeastern part of Blagoevgrad Province in southwestern Bulgaria. The administrative center is the town of Hadzhidimovo, located in the northern part of the municipality. To the South Hadzhidimovo Municipality is bordering with the Greek municipality Kato Nevrokopi. Four Bulgarian municipalities are surrounding it: to the East is Satovcha Municipality, to the North are Garmen and Gotse Delchev municipalities and to the west is Sandanski Municipality.

== Geography and landscape ==
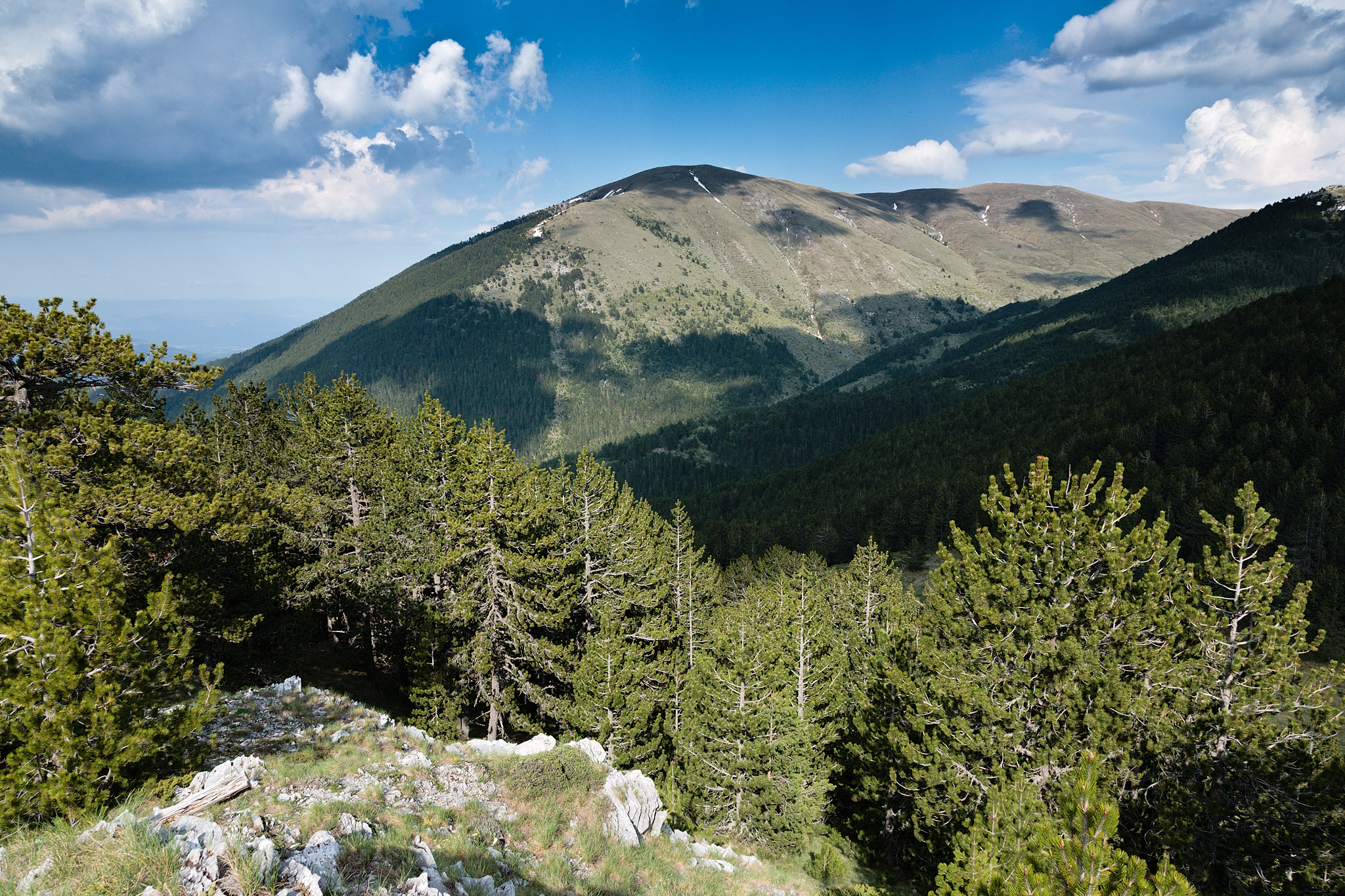
Tsari vrah 2183m

Hadzhidimovo municipality is a mountainous municipality spread over the most southeastern slopes of the Pirin mountain, the northeastern part of the Slavyanka mountain, the western slopes of Dabrash part of the Rhodope Mountains and the southernmost part of the Mesta river valley and a small part of the Gotse Delchev hollow. The landscape of the municipality is very diverse. The Pirin part is typically mountainous, rugged with deep ravines and sharp ridges, with large differences in altitude. From the main watershed ridge of Pirin to the East descend a number of smaller ridges. Notable karst character of the almost bare rocky slopes hills, "Gaytaninovski pazlak" near Gaytaninovo southeast of the village, and "Copper Rock," "Garvanova rock" rise above the villages of Laki, New Leski and Ilinden. The Rhodopes part east of Mesta is also mountainous, crossed by deep ravines, but there are also smaller ridges with more rounded shapes. The town of Hadzhidimovo is 85 kilometres South-East of Blagoevgrad (115 km by road) and 138 kilometres South-South-East of Sofia (212 km by road). The highest point of the municipality is "Tsari vrah" - 2183 meters above sea level in the Slavyanka mountain. The town of Hadzhidimowo is situated in the lowest part of the municipality.

== History ==
The municipality of Hadzhidimovo has been a home to many tribes throughout the years but most important have been the Thracians, Slavs and Protobulgarians. The Thracian tribe of Bessi was the main tribe that settled in the region and there are a large number of remains left in the area, proof of their rich life here. The villages of Blatska, Debren, Dabnitsa and Hvostyane have found fragments of Attic vessels and there are mound necropolises.

In about 146 AD, after long battles between Roman troops and Thracians, the area around Gotse Delchev fell to Roman rule. In 106 the emperor Trajan built the city Nicopolis ad Nestum in honor of his victory. This town was destroyed at the end of the 6th century by the Slavs and the tribe of the Smolyani settled here. The Slavs were farmers and herdsmen. They grew millet, wheat, flax, hemp and leguminous plants and they also bred birds, cattle, sheep and goats.

== Towns and villages ==
The following towns and villages are located in Hadzhidimovo Municipality:

- Hadzhidimovo (Хаджидимово)
- Ablanitsa (Абланица)
- Beslen (Беслен)
- Blatska (Блатска)
- Gaytaninovo (Гайтаниново)
- Ilinden (Илинден)
- Koprivlen (Копривлен)
- Laki (Лъки)
- Nova Lovcha (Нова Ловча)
- Novo Leski (Ново Лески)
- Paril (Парил)
- Petrelik (Петрелик)
- Sadovo (Садово)
- Teplen (Теплен)
- Teshovo (Тешово)

== Economy and transportation ==
The territorial distribution of the economic activities is very uneven. The main economic activities are concentrated in the town of Hadzhidimovo and in the villages of Koprivlen and Ablanitsa. The industries are the main source of income - they generate almost 70% of the net income in the municipality. The main occupation of the rural population is associated with tobacco growing and cattle-breeding. Automobile transportation is the only type of transport in the municipality. There is a secondary road from Koprivlen, which is situated on the main road Razlog - Drama, towards Satovcha, that connects Hadzhidimovo with Gotse Delchev. Buses run daily to Gotse Delchev, Satovcha, Blagoevgrad and Sofia.

== Education, culture and religion ==
Two secondary schools, three primary schools, three kindergartens and eleven community centers are opened in the municipality. There are twelve churches and one monastery of the Bulgarian Orthodox Church. Four mosques are built in the pomak villages of the municipality.

According to the latest Bulgarian census of 2011, the religious composition, among those who answered the optional question on religious identification, was the following:

Religious composition of Hadzidimovo Municipality
Orthodox Christianity	63.04%
Catholicism	0.16%
Protestantism	0.00%
Islam	34.57%
No religion	0.14%
Prefer not to answer, others and indefinable	2.09%
