= Gaytaninovo =

Gaytaninovo Гайтаниново
- Village
- Location within Bulgaria
- Coordinates: 41°27′N 23°43′E
- Country: Bulgaria
- Province: Blagoevgrad Province
- Municipality: Hadzhidimovo Municipality

Government
  - Suffragan mayor: Georgi Hadzhiev

Area
  - Total: 26.891 km^{2} (10.383 sq mi)

Population (2018)
  - Total: 46
- Time zone: UTC+2 (EET)
  - Summer (DST): UTC+3 (EEST)

Gaytaninovo is a village in Hadzhidimovo Municipality, in Blagoevgrad Province, Bulgaria.

== Geography ==
The village of Gaytaninovo is located in a mountainous area. It is situated on the southeastern slopes of Southern Pirin in the historical and geographical area of Mervashko. The village is 17 km southwest of the Hadzhidimovo municipal center and 19 km south of Gotse Delchev. The climate is transitional Mediterranean with mountain influence with summer minimum and winter maximum of rainfalls. The average annual rainfall is about 750 mm. The river Mutnitsa runs through the village. The soils are humus-carbonate.

In 2012 on the territory of Gaitaninovo a protected area named "Zhingov bryast" was declared for protection of rare plants.

== History ==
About 4 km west of the village, a ceramic material was found in the Kulata locality, indicating the existence of life from the early Iron Age. Remains of an ancient fortress wall, partly used in the Middle Ages, have been preserved.

According to an old legend, the inhabitants of the villages of Sveta Marina, Trohalia, Gradishte and Serbbakovo settled on the site of today's village in order to escape from the outrages of the Turks. The names Gaitanine and Gaitanina are mentioned in Ottoman tax registers from the second half of the 15th century, 1623 - 1625, 1635 - 1637 and 1660.

In the 18th and 19th centuries iron ore (magnetite sand) was extracted in the village, which was exported for melting in the kilns of the village of Teshovo. The ore deposits cover an area of about 500 acres. The ore was washed in artificial ladders and stone slabs. From the received iron in the iron workshops (forges) were made horseshoes (plates) and studs, which are exported to the markets in Thessaloniki. There were about 120 forges in the village. The extraction of iron ore continued until 1870. In addition to ironmaking construction workers and harvesters from Gaitaninovo went to seasonal work inland and mainly in Drama.

In the beginning of the eighteenth century the church of St. George was built, and a church school was opened. In 1839 the church of St. Nicholas was built with a clock on the bell tower. In 1858 a new Bulgarian school was opened in Gaitaninovo with its first teacher Georgi Zimbilev. The villagers actively participated in the struggles of the Bulgarians for church independence and New Bulgarian education. On December 6, 1869, a national council was organized in Gaitaninovo, organized by the Bulgarian municipalities in Nevrokop, Drama, Seres and Melnik. Following a solemn service in the local church, the categorical rejection of the Constantinople Patriarchate and the request for the establishment of a unified Nevrokop-Melnik-Drama-Seres Bulgarian Diocese were proclaimed. According to the honored Renaissance teacher Spas Prokopov, in the years 1869 - 1870 the village became the center of Bulgarianness in Nevrokop, thanks to the local Bulgarian school. The Greeks at that time called Gaitaninovo "the sacred sanctuary of the Bulgarians."

In the nineteenth century Gaitaninovo was a pure Bulgarian village. In the Ethnography of the vilayets of Adrianople, Monastir and Thessaloniki, published in Constantinople in 1878 and reflecting the statistics of the male population of 1873, Gaïtaninovo was referred to as a village with 180 households and 640 Bulgarians.

In 1889, Stefan Verkovic (Topographical-Ethnographic Outline of Macedonia) marks Gaitaninovo as a village with 150 Bulgarian houses.

In 1891 Vasil Kanchov visited the area and left interesting travel notes for Gaitaninovo. Here's what he wrote:

"The village has 200 houses purely Bulgarian, but overlooks like a small town. It is one of the most awakened villages not only in the area, but throughout Macedonia. The main reason for the development of the peasants was the trade that the peasants were doing with the surrounding places. The main occupation of the peasants was, until recently, making slabs for forging cattle. Around 60 dukes with more than 400 workers worked the plates all year. Others carried the manufactured goods to the fairs around. "

According to the secretary of the Bulgarian Exarchate Dimitar Mishev ("La Macédoine et sa Population Chrétienne"), in 1905, 1416 Bulgarian exarchists live in Gaitaninovo. The village has a Bulgarian elementary school with 1 teacher and 74 students. („La Macédoine et sa Population Chrétienne“) в 1905 година в Гайтаниново живеят 1416 българи екзархисти. В селото функционира българско начално училище с 1 учител и 74 ученици.

In 1895, a VMORO committee was established in the village.

On October 11, 1908, a teachers 'assembly (congress) was held in Gaitaninovo, at which, after examining the state of the Neurocope school and the situation of the rural teachers, a teachers' association (called the union and later a union) was founded.

In a report to Hilarion Neurokopski from 1909 he wrote about the village:

"Gaytaninovo ... is located at the foot of Alibotush. There is a nice oak grove near the village. The village has 200 Bulgarian houses with 1000 people. The peasants are engaged in agriculture and animal husbandry. Some of them are construction workers and bricklayers. Farmers cultivate vineyards and more. The church "St. Nicholas' is a large building. It is well decorated inside. It was founded in 1839. 70 years ago it belonged to the Greeks, and then to the Bulgarians. The spiritual struggle took place quite early. There is an old church near the village - "St. Georgi “The school is next to the church, it is a rather large building, but it needs repair."

During the First Balkan War of 1912, 37 people from Gaitaninovo volunteered for the Macedonian-Adrianopolitan Volunteer Corps.

== Population ==
Gaitaninovo was once a populated village and at the beginning of the 20th century there lived more than 1,000 people. Through the years, people migrated to neighbouring towns and elsewhere, even abroad. Now the village is sparsely populated with permanent inhabitants, but many come here for the weekends and vacations. There are places for accommodation - a hotel and few guesthouses.

- 1934 – 810 people;
- 1946 – 900 people;
- 1956 – 623 people;
- 1965 – 546 people;
- 1975 – 349 people;
- 1985 – 214 people;
- 1992 – 216 people;
- 2001 – 124 people;
- 2011 – 75 people;
- 2018 – 46 people;

== Economy and transportation ==
Tourism is the main source of income for the village. There are few touristic complexes and guesthouses. The majority of the population is not economically active. The village is connected with Hadzhidimovo by bus few times a week. The medical aid is provided by a general practitioner and paramedic. There is a post office, fixed telephony and mobile services in the village.

== Education ==
The first school is opened in the beginning of the 18th century. In 1858 a new Bulgarian school was opened in Gaitaninovo with its first teacher Georgi Zimbilev. A middle school named "Otets Paisii" was functional till 1997 year. Now it is closed and the building is ruined. There aren't any educational institutions in the village.

== Religion ==
The population is Orthodox Christian.There are three churches in the village. The oldest one is dedicated to St. George and was built in the beginning of the XVIII century. The church was fully rebuilt in 2016 year. It is near the cemetery. The second church dedicated to St Nicolas was built in 1839 year. There is а high bell tower with a clock. The third church is outside the village. It is dedicated to the Holy Virgin Mary. It is built in 1990 on the foundations of older church.

== Notable people ==
- Konstantin Zhostov (1867–1916), a Bulgarian general from the Balkan wars and the First World War
