= Ilinden, Blagoevgrad Province =

Ilinden Илинден
- Village
- Location within Bulgaria
- Coordinates: 41°28′N 23°48′E
- Country: Bulgaria
- Province: Blagoevgrad Province
- Municipality: Hadzhidimovo Municipality

Government
  - Suffragan Mayor: Lyuben Vodenov

Area
  - Total: 36.519 km^{2} (14.100 sq mi)

Population (2020)
  - Total: 92
- Time zone: UTC+2 (EET)
  - Summer (DST): UTC+3 (EEST)

Ilinden (Bulgarian: Илинден [iˈlindɛn]) is a village in Hadzhidimovo Municipality, in Blagoevgrad Province, Bulgaria. It is located in a mountainous area, on the northern slopes of the Stargach mountain. It is 14 kilometers southwest of Hadzidimovo Municipal Center and 18 kilometers southeast of Gotse Delchev. The climate is transitional Mediterranean with mountain influence with summer minimum and winter maximum of rainfall. The average annual rainfall is about 700 mm. The Mutnitsa River flows through the village. The soils are predominantly humus-carbonate.

== History ==
The old name of the village before 1951 was Libyahovo. According to professor Ivan Duridanov, the settlement's name Libyahovo with an earlier form, Lyubyahovo, comes from the personal name Lyubyah. According to a local legend, the name comes from the name of one Ali Bey, and according to another, from the great love (lyubov in Bulgarian), uniting his inhabitants against the Ottoman rule during the Ottoman rule.

There are ruins of an ancient fortress Gradishte, located 2 km east of the village.

In the nineteenth century, Libyahovo was a large village with a predominant Bulgarian population, belonging to the Nevrokop kaza of the Seres sanjak. The Church of the Assumption of the Virgin Mary was built in 1828–1831. In the Ethnography of the Villanets of Adrianople, Monastir and Thessaloniki, published in Constantinople in 1878 and reflecting the statistics of the male population of 1873, Lubiahovo is cited as a village with 253 households and 850 Bulgarians.

In 1889, Stefan Verkovic (Topographical-Ethnographic Outline of Macedonia) notes Libyahovo as a village with 245 Bulgarian houses.

In 1891 Vasil Kanchov visited Nevrokopsko and left interesting travel notes for Libyahovo. Here's what he writes:

"Libyahovo has a very nice view. It is located on a small tributary of the Burovitsa River. There is a wonderful view from the top where I was. Above it you can see cultivated fields and meadows below. It counts 300 Bulgarian houses. The peasants were awakened as those from Gaytaninovo. Since 1870 they have a Bulgarian school. They stood in the ranks of the first fighters in the fight against the Greek bishop, but in 1887, threatened greatly by the military commandant at Nevrocop, recognized the authority of the bishop. This year they renounced it. [8] " According to the statistical surveys of Vasil Kunchov ("Macedonia. Ethnography and Statistics"), by 1900 the village population had a total of 1720 people, of which 1660 were Christian and 60 were Gypsies.

According to the secretary of the Bulgarian Exarchate Dimitar Mishev ("La Macédoine et sa Population Chrétienne"), in 1905 the Christian population of Libiahovo consisted of 1,800 Bulgarian exarchists and 18 Gypsies. There is a Bulgarian elementary school in the village with 1 teacher and 65 students.

At the outbreak of the Balkan War in 1912, 55 people from Libyahovo volunteered in the Macedonian-Adrianopolitan Volunteer Corps.

== Economy, transportation ==
The village is very close to a border crossing with Greece on the way between Razlog and Drama, Greece on a secondary road No.19. There aren't any industrial subjects in it. There are no educational institutions in Ilinden, though in the past there existed a school.

== Religion ==
The people in the village are predominantly Orthodox Christian. The first church is built "Assumption of Holy Virgin Mary" in 1831 year and is yet functional. There is another Orthodox church "St Atanasios the Great", built in the recent years.
