= Hadzhidimovo =

Hadzhidimovo Хаджидимово
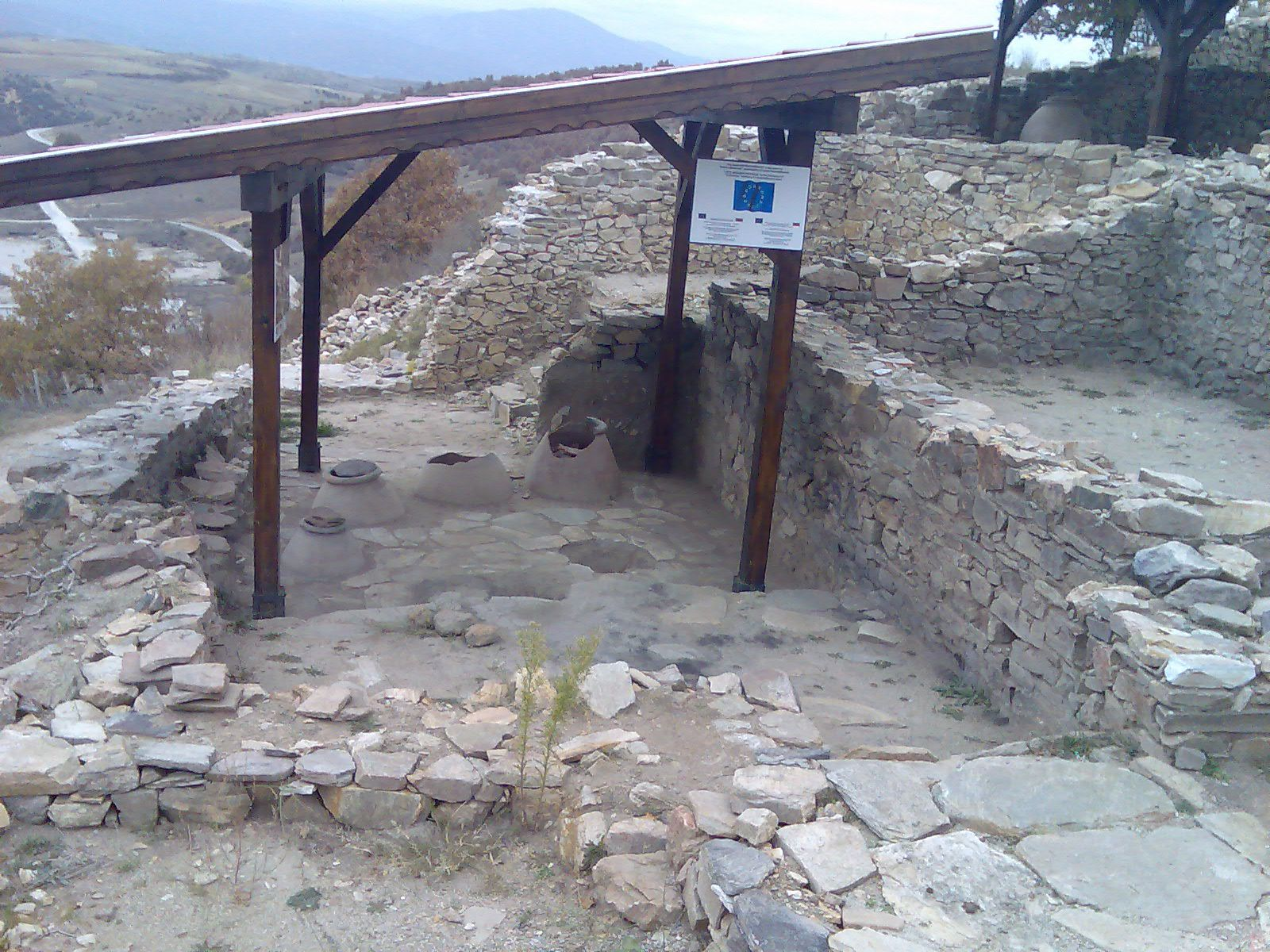
- Ruins of an ancient fortress near Hadzhidimovo

- Location of Hadzhidimovo in Bulgaria
- Coordinates: 41°31′19″N 23°52′8.4″E
- Country: Bulgaria
- Province (Oblast): Blagoevgrad

Government

Area
  - Total: 333 km^{2} (129 sq mi)
- Elevation: 485 m (1,591 ft)

Population
  - Total: 4,560
- Postal code: 2933
- Area code: 07528

Hadzhidimovo (Bulgarian: Хаджидимово [xɐˈd͡ʒidimovo]) is a small town and the centre of Hadzhidimovo Municipality in Blagoevgrad Province, south-western Bulgaria.

It is located in the southernmost part of Bulgaria, bordering on Greece in the Chech region.

== Geography ==
The town lies in the Mesta River valley, surrounded by the heights of Rila, Pirin, Slavyanka, Shilka, Bozdag, and the Western Rhodopes Mountains.

Although the town is located in a Mediterranean climate region, temperatures quite often fall below 0 °C in winter, and the summers are hot with temperatures sometimes reaching 45 °C.

== History ==
Hadzhidimovo was formed through the merger of the villages of Gorna Singartia and Dolna Singartia. Throughout the 19th century, researchers listed the two villages as having a predominantly ethnic Bulgarian population with a Turkish minority.

For a while after the merger, the settlement was known as Zhostovo, after Bulgarian general Konstantin Zhostov who was born in nearby Gaytaninovo. Today (since 1951), it bears the name of leftist Internal Macedonian Revolutionary Organization (IMRO) revolutionary Dimo Hadzhidimov. Hadzhidimovo was proclaimed a town in 1996.

== Transportation ==
The municipality is crossed by the II-19 highway from Gotse Delchev, Koprivlen, and Sadovo to the Greek border at Ilinden.
