= Bukovo (disambiguation) =

Bukovo (Macedonian: Буково) is a village in the Bitola municipality, Republic of North Macedonia.

Bukovo may also refer to:

- Bukovo, Blagoevgrad Province (Bulgarian: Буково), Bulgaria
- Bukovo, Vologda Oblast, Russia
- Bukovo, Cerkno, Slovenia
- Bukovo monastery
- a name for crushed red pepper in many Southeast European languages

== See also ==
- Bukowo (disambiguation)
