= Dobrotino =

Dobrotino Добротино
- Village
- Location within Bulgaria
- Coordinates: 41°35′N 23°41′E
- Country: Bulgaria
- Province: Blagoevgrad Province
- Municipality: Gotse Delchev

Government
  - Suffragan mayor: Ivan Karailiev

Area
  - Total: 22.62 km^{2} (8.73 sq mi)
- Elevation: 650 m (2,130 ft)

Population (15-03-2012)
  - Total: 46
- GRAO
- Time zone: UTC+2 (EET)
  - Summer (DST): UTC+3 (EEST)
- Postal Code: 2919
- Area code: 0751

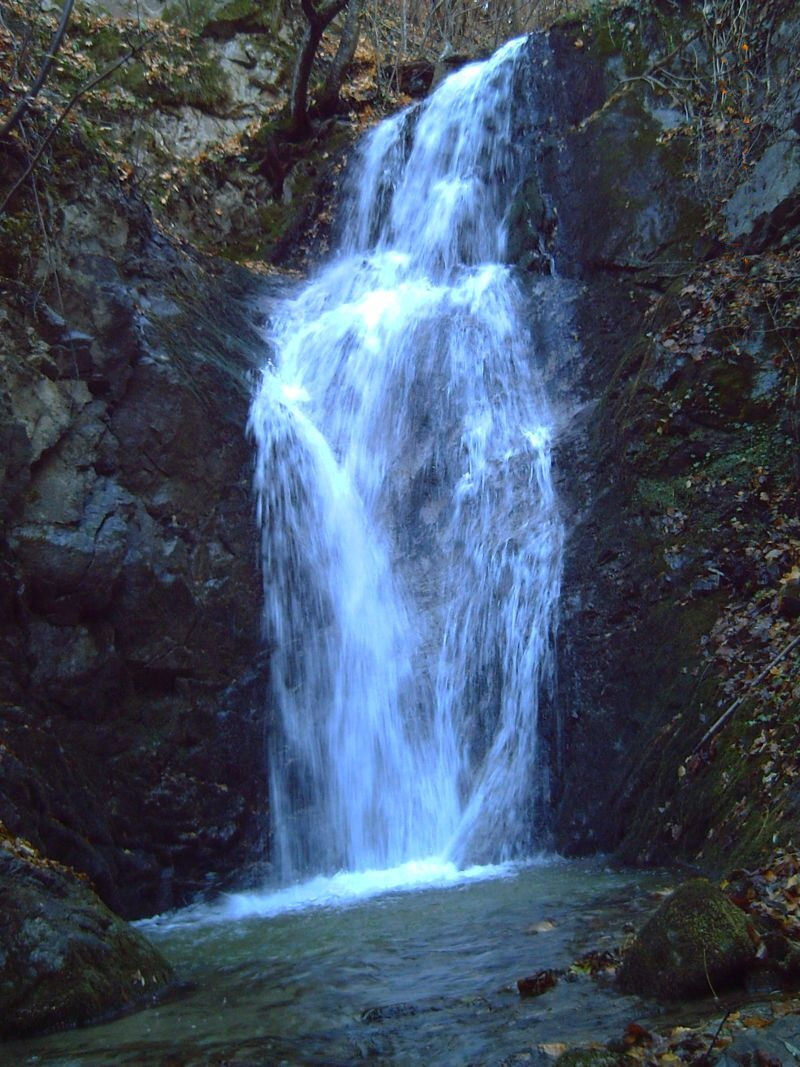
The large waterfall near the village of Dobrotino, Bulgaria.

Dobrotino (before 1934: Dag chiflik) is a mountainous roadside village in Gotse Delchev Municipality, in Blagoevgrad Province, Bulgaria. The village is situated 4 kilometers west-northwest of Gotse Delchev and 68 kilometers southeast of Blagoevgrad on the road between Gotse Delchev and Petrich. Nearby is the local resort "Popovi livadi". The village is sparsely populated after a landslide in 1962, that did not cause any damage, but the people moved to Borovo and Banichan in the municipality. Before 1962 there were about 600 residents and now less than 50 live in the village. In 2005 year was built the church "St Prophet Elijah" over the foundations of a monastery destroyed in the 19th century.

In 2013 the church "St Prophet Elijah" was renovated and upgraded.
