= Zaim Chiflik =

Zaim Chiflik Заим чифлик
- Former village
- Location within Bulgaria
- Coordinates: 41°34′N 23°46′E
- Country: Bulgaria
- Province: Blagoevgrad Province
- Municipality: Gotse Delchev
- Elevation: 500 m (1,600 ft)

Population (2007)
  - Total: 0
- Time zone: UTC+2 (EET)
  - Summer (DST): UTC+3 (EEST)

Zaim Chiflik (Bulgarian: Заим чифлик) is a former village in the Gotse Delchev Municipality, Blagoevgrad District, Bulgaria. The village was situated about 3 kilometers south of Gotse Delchev, located alongside the former military airport of Musomishta.

In the 1878 report „Ethnographie des Vilayets d'Andrinople, de Monastir et de Salonique“ which is based on 1873 data it is reported that the village and three adjoining farms consisted of 51 households and 200 Bulgarian residents.

Statistics gathered by Vasil Kanchov reported a population of 90 by 1900, all Bulgarian Christians.
