= Delchevo =

Delchevo (Cyrillic: Делчево) is a common name for a settlement in the central Balkan peninsula. It is typically named after Gotse Delchev. The places could refer to any of the following:

- Delčevo, a town in eastern North Macedonia, along the border with Bulgaria.
- Delchevo, Blagoevgrad Province, a settlement in Bulgaria.
- Delchevo, Razgrad Province, a settlement in Bulgaria.

== See also ==
- Gotse Delchev (town), a town in south-western Bulgaria.
