= Gotse Delchev, Blagoevgrad Province =

Town in Blagoevgrad, Bulgaria

Gotse Delchev Гоце Делчев
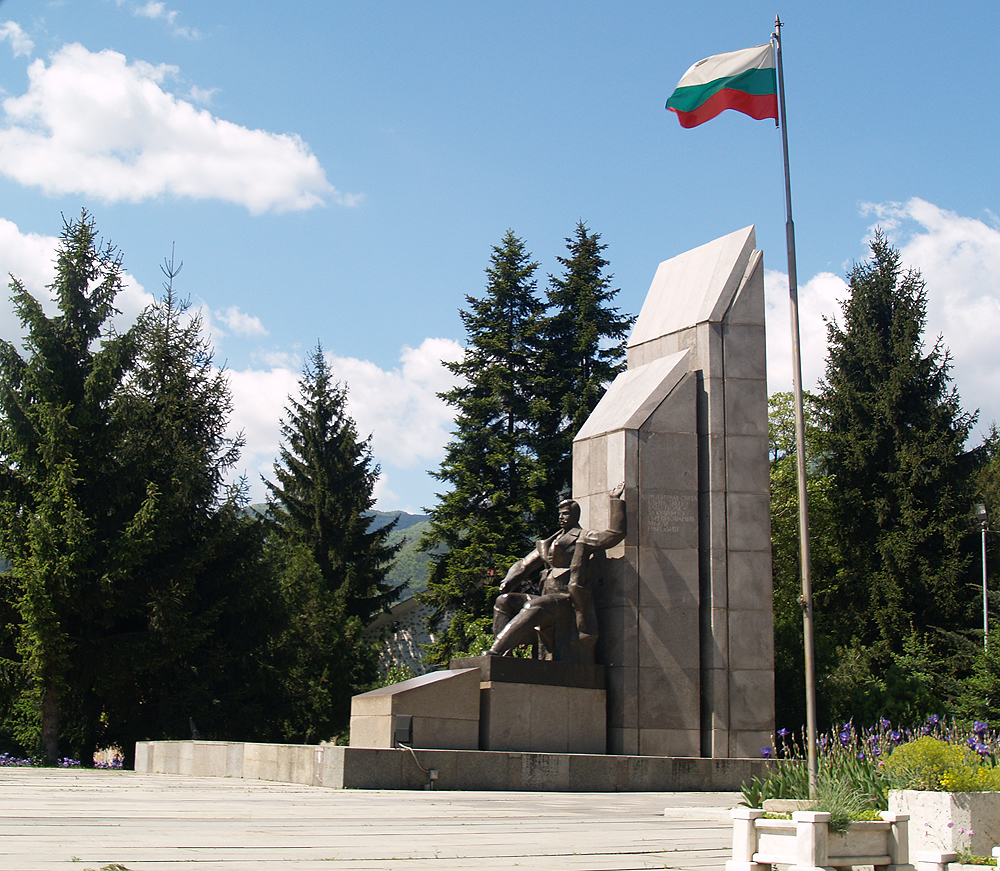
- Monument of Gotse Delchev

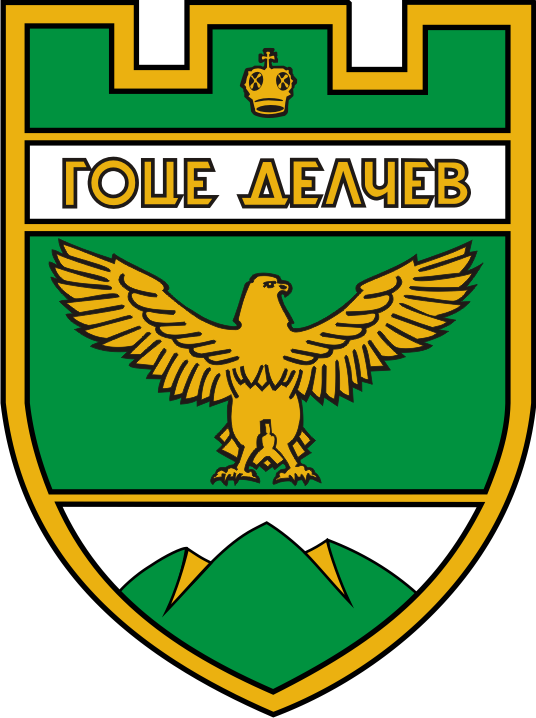
- Seal

- Location of Gotse Delchev (town)
- Coordinates: 41°34′N 23°44′E
- Country: Bulgaria
- Province (Oblast): Blagoevgrad
- Municipality: Gotse Delchev Municipality

Government
  - Mayor: Vladimir Moskov (BSP)
- Elevation: 540 m (1,770 ft)

Population (2021)
  - City: 18,237
  - Urban: 29,585
- Time zone: UTC+2 (EET)
  - Summer (DST): UTC+3 (EEST)
- Postal Code: 2900
- Area code: 751

Gotse Delchev (Bulgarian: Гоце Делчев [ˈɡɔt͡sɛ ˈdɛɫt͡ʃɛf]) is a town in Gotse Delchev Municipality in Blagoevgrad Province of Bulgaria.

In 1951, the town was renamed after the revolutionary leader Gotse Delchev. It had hitherto been called Nevrokop (in Bulgarian: Неврокоп, Nevrokop; in Greek: Άνω Νευροκόπι, romanized: Ano Nevrokopi, lit. 'Upper Nevrokopi'; and in Turkish: Nevrokop).

Nearby are the remains of a walled city established by the Romans in the 2nd century AD. The town was a kaza in the Siroz sanjak of the Salonica vilayet before the Balkan Wars.

== Geography ==
Gotse Delchev is situated in a mountainous area, about 200 km (124 mi) from the capital Sofia and 97 km (60 mi) from the city of Blagoevgrad in the southern part of Blagoevgrad district. The town center is 545 m (1,788 ft) above sea level. The Gotse Delchev Hollow is characterized by a continental climate; rainfall occurs mainly during spring and autumn, and summers are hot and dry. Winter temperature inversions are possible.

== Population ==
Year	Population
1985	19,699
1992	20,454
2000	20,110
2005	20,198
2010	19,918
2012	19,219
2021	18,237

== History ==
=== Antiquity and medieval period ===
Nicopolis ad Nestum was one of two fortified towns founded to mark Emperor Trajan's victory in 105-106 AD over the Dacians. The area had been inhabited for about 14 centuries and attained its peak in late antiquity (4th-6th centuries AD). The original town occupied about 25–30 decаres. The Slavs destroyed Nicopolis in the 6th-7th centuries but it re-emerged as a medieval settlement in the late 10th century.

=== Ottoman period ===
Nevrokop became part of the Ottoman Empire sometime between 1374 and 1383, when the Ottoman Turks captured Serres and Drama. The town was included in the Ottoman documents sometime after the final conquest of Thessaloniki by the Ottoman Empire in 1430. Under the name Nevrokop, the town is mentioned in the Ottoman Tahrir defter Mal. No. 525 from 1444, in which it was described as a large Christian village – center of ziamet, numbering 131 households, 12 singles and 24 widows. Thus, Nevrokop was the largest settlement in the region. Then, Nevrokop developed very quickly and became a Muslim city. Ottoman tax registers from 1464 to 1465 mark 208 Christian households, 50 singles and 19 widows, and 12 Muslim households. During the 1478–1479 registration year, Nevrekop recorded 393 Christian households, 31 widows, and 42 Muslim households.

In the 1480s, a large domed mosque and Islamic school were founded in Nevrokop by Mehmed Bey, son of Karadja Pasha. This mosque is the only Ottoman architectural monument in the city that survives to this day. In 1512, Koja Mustafa Pasha founded a second mosque, a bath, and a second school. In 1519 (Hijri 925), the town of Nevrekop had 167 Muslim households and 124 unmarried Muslim men and 319 Christian households and 26 unmarried Christian men, and it was a zeamet of Şah Hüseyin Bey kethudâ of Kara Hamid. In 1565, Sultan Suleiman I issued a decree for the construction of a mosque to commemorate his son Şehzade Mehmed.

In the 17th century, there was a decline in the growth of the city. Hadji Kalfa mentioned Nevrokop as a judicial center and noted the presence of mines around the town, with rich deposits of iron ore. In the official list of the judicial centers, 1667–1668, Nevrokop ranks fourth among the twelve judicial centers in Rumelia, which shows its importance as a town. The most detailed description of Nevrokop in Ottoman times is given in Volume VII of the Ottoman traveler Evliya Çelebi. He describes the city as being large, with many mosques, twelve minarets, tekkes for dervishes, inns, hammams, schools, and many beautiful houses and residences of numerous provincial administrations.

Nevrokop in the Ottoman times became a center of cultural life. Among famous artists born in the city are Rana Mustafa Efendi Nakshbendi – in service to Muhammad Ali of Egypt. Nakshbendi died in 1832 in his hometown of Nevrokop. He is likely to have inspired the last Nevrokop mosque, which closely resembled the buildings erected by Muhammad Ali in Kavala in 1818–1821. Zyuhri Ahmed Effendi, the founder of the religious current "zyuhrie", was also born in Nevrokop. He died in Thessaloniki in 1751 and was buried in the tekke, which he had built during his lifetime.

A. Sinve, in his work Les Grecs de l'Empire Ottoman. Etude Statistique et Ethnographique, which is based on Greek data, wrote in 1878 that in Nevrekop (Névrékop), there lived 1,200 Greeks. In 1889, Stefan Verkovich notes Nevrokop as a city with 209 Bulgarian, 1,675 Turkish, and 38 Aromanian houses.

=== Bulgarian national revival ===
In the 19th century, along with agriculture, husbandry, and beekeeping, the town of Gotse Delchev developed coppersmithing and goldsmithing crafts, packsaddle manufacturing, homespun, leather, and timber trades. Local traders carried goods to sell at fairs in Serres, Drama, Melnik, and Uzundzhovo. Since the second half of the 19th century, every year in August the Nevrokop Fair was held, which attracted merchants from the Ottoman Empire, Austria-Hungary, France, and other countries.

In 1808–1811, the Christian community in the town built a small church dedicated to the Archangels Michael and Gabriel. During the years 1833–1841, they built a large church to the Holy Virgin Mary, which is a result of reforms in the Empire.

The Bulgarian population of Nevrokop stood against the Greek clergy for church independence and early Bulgarian education. In 1862, the town had its first Bulgarian school, with the first teacher being Todor Nenov, and in 1867, a school for girls was opened. The Greek Orthodox Bishop Agathangel allowed the use of half the urban school for Bulgarian classes, but after protests by Greeks and Vlachs, the Bulgarian school was closed and Nenov expelled. Bulgarians in the city threatened communion with the Pope, and the bishop reopened the Bulgarian school. In 1865, a community center was opened and in 1870, a female community. In 1873, a teachers' community, called "Enlightenment", was formed, which played an important role in the struggles of the Bulgarians. The Bulgarian communities in Plovdiv and Pazardzhik had a positive impact on the cultural revival of Nevrokop: they assisted with teachers, teaching materials, books, and money.

After the Russo-Turkish War in 1877–1878 and the Berlin Congress of 1878, Nevrokop remained within the Ottoman Empire (as did the whole of Macedonia). The divided Bulgarian lands became the arena of the process of national unification. In May 1878, representatives of the Bulgarian community in Nevrokop signed the "Memorandum of the Bulgarian church and school communities in Macedonia", stating that they wanted to join Macedonia in the newly formed Bulgarian state.

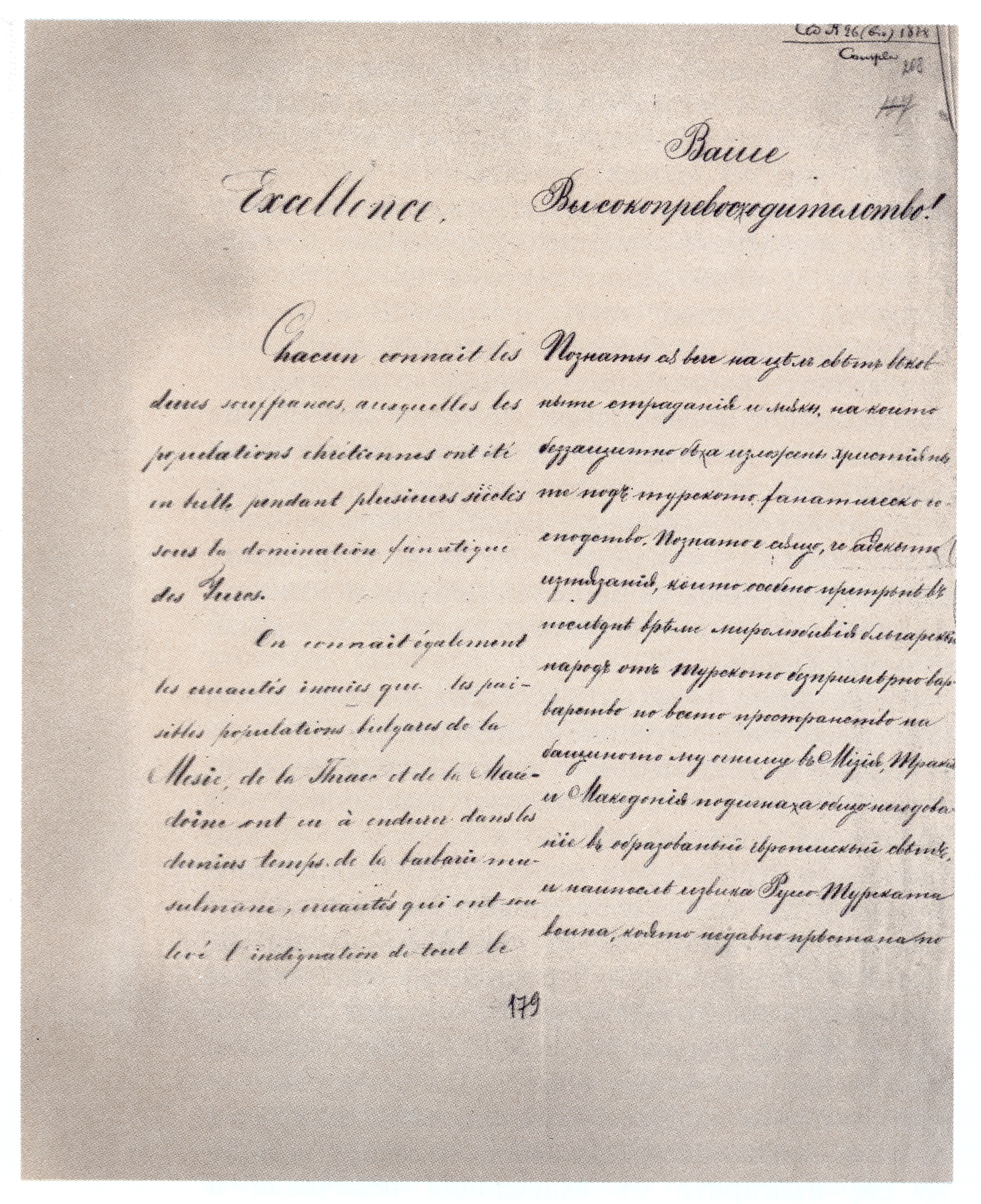
Macedonian Bulgarian Memorandum to the Great Powers, 1878

According to geographer Dimitri Mishev (D. M. Brancoff), the town had a population of 1,646 Christians in 1905, consisting of 1,016 Exarchist Bulgarians, 288 Patriarchist Bulgarians, 168 Vlachs, 114 Roma people, and 60 Greeks. The city operated one elementary and one lower-secondary Bulgarian school with 6 teachers and 151 students, and two Greek schools starting with 6 teachers and 77 students.

=== Nevrokop in the Kingdom of Bulgaria ===
The town became part of Bulgaria after the First Balkan War of 19 October 1912. The first mayor of the city after the liberation was the poet Peyo Yavorov. The inclusion of the area within the Kingdom of Bulgaria led to a mass exodus of Muslims from the town and to a lesser extent, from the villages. In their place settled Bulgarian refugees from the regions of Serres and Drama, whose homelands fell under the rule of Greece. The census of 1926 clearly noted the changes. At that time in Nevrokop there were only 1,057 Turks, while Bulgarians numbered 5,882. The census of 1934 showed this trend continuing – 824 Turks and 7,726 Bulgarians were counted.

After the liberation of the city from Ottoman rule, Nevrokop began a slow process of resettlement of refugees from Aegean Macedonia in the years between the Balkan Wars and the First World War, which changed the whole look of the city. Late Baroque Bulgarian houses were built in the central part of the town, and this architecture has been preserved ever since.

In 1922, forces of the Macedonian Federative Organization with the support of the Bulgarian government attacked the IMRO local detachments. As result of this unrest, on 17 October, Nevrokop was occupied by IMRO forces, who banished the Federalists, but with no further serious consequences. In the years of the Bulgarian resistance movement during World War II, a formation led by Aneshti Uzunov operated in the region. After his death in 1943, it was named after him. On 11 September 1944, the Partisans from that formation came from Garmen and took control of the area.

=== 1944–1989 ===
After the Bulgarian coup d'état of 1944, the newly established government started a major persecution of people who were in any way affiliated to the former monarchist government and its local authorities. Many people were arrested and some of them were executed without legal process; others were sentenced to death by the special People's Court. Many of the detainees were imprisoned for life or given different terms. Some of the accused were declared "missing" and never reappeared. Thus, many supporters or members of IMRO were persecuted. Many of them fled abroad.

In 1951, Nevrokop was renamed after the revolutionary Gotse Delchev.

In the following years, agriculture remained the main source of income due to the fertility of arable land and the favorable climate in the Gotse Delchev hollow. Cooperative farming was enforced, and after 1971, the land was fully nationalized. Food, wood, and tobacco processing industries were developed, and most of the yield from the area was processed there. Plants for FM radio transmitters, parts for tower cranes, plastic goods, zippers, and clothing were also built.

The road system of the region suffered from lack of repair, and improvement and transportation became long and expensive. Railroad were never planned or built. Distances from Blagoevgrad and Sofia and the difficult roads in the winter led to further isolation of Gotse Delchev. The closed border with Greece and the special admission controls contributed to this process. The town lost its previous importance and even the seat of the Nevrokop Metropolitan Orthodox bishop was transferred to Blagoevgrad.

=== 1989–present ===
After the change of political system in 1989, the restitution of property, and the privatization of state-owned industries, the economy of Gotse Delchev became reshaped, especially in the area of agriculture. Most of the assets of mechanized farming were lost. Arable land was divided into small pieces, much of which went uncultivated and became deserted. Some industrial projects were closed or worked at a minimal rate. In recent years, heavier industries were abandoned, but light industries and processing factories have bloomed. After the opening of a new border crossing point between Gotse Delchev and Drama, Greece in 2005, the town gained new importance. Roads leading to the region have been repaired and improved.

== Economy ==
=== Industry and trade ===
The municipality has been isolated from big industrial centers in Bulgaria due to its geographic location near the closed border with Greece for about sixty years, and the lack of natural resources, the long distances between Gotse Delchev and other bigger towns, and the narrow and poorly maintained roads have contributed to this as well. After the opening of the Ilinden–Exochi border crossing and improvement of the road system in the area, the economy of the municipality has changed. Light industries are well presented in the town of Gotse Delchev. Textile and shoe industries, zipper production, plastics processing, paper and wood processing, and tobacco growing and processing are major sources of income in the municipality. There are no big department stores, but a wide variety of smaller shops exist in the town.

=== Agriculture, forestry, and stock-breeding ===
The Mediterranean influence in the wide valley of the Mesta river is favorable for modern and productive agriculture. Tobacco was the most important crop in earlier years, representing a large part of the region's agriculture; however, the worldwide decline in smoking and a change in the state policy of subsidies for tobacco production have caused tobacco farming to decrease. People also grow wheat, maize for grain, beans, sunflowers, potatoes, tomatoes, peppers, apples, grapes, strawberries, raspberries, blackberries, and other fruits.

=== Transportation and infrastructure ===
The only transportation available in the town is by automobile. Most of the streets are paved. Buses connect the town with Sofia, Blagoevgrad, and the villages in Gotse Delchev municipality, as well as Garmen and Hadzhidimovo municipalities. Multiple cellphone operators cover the town; there are also landline telephones, internet, and cable TV. Electricity and water supply utilities cover the whole town.

== Administration and politics ==
Gotse Delchev, the town, is the administrative centre of Gotse Delchev Municipality, part of Blagoevgrad Province, which includes the following places:

- Banichan
- Borovo
- Breznitsa
- Bukovo
- Delchevo
- Dobrotino
- Gospodintsi
- Gotse Delchev
- Kornitsa
- Lazhnitsa
- Musomishta

The town and the municipality are governed by a mayor and by the municipal administration. The current mayor, serving his fifth term (as of 2014), is Vladimir Moskov, from the BSP.

A regional police department and a branch of the Blagoevgrad firefighting department are located in the town.

== Education ==
=== Preschool education ===
- Nursery "Prolet" ("Spring")
- Kindergarten with nursery group No.1 "Kalinka" ("Ladybug")
- Kindergarten with nursery group No.2 "Gianni Rodari"
- Kindergarten with nursery group No.3 "Detelina"("Clover")
- Kindergarten No.1 "Snezhanka" ("Snow White")
- Kindergarten No.4 "Radost" ("Joy")
- Kindergarten No.5 "Brezichka" ("Little birch")
- Kindergarten No.6 "Slance" ("Sun")

=== Primary education ===
- 1st Primary school "St. Cyril and Methodius"
- 2nd Primary School "Gotse Delchev"
- 3rd Primary School "Miladinov Brothers"
- School for children with special educational needs "Vasil Levski" with "Ivan Kyulev" orphanage

=== Secondary education ===
- PMG Yane Sandanski, founded in 1920

The school has admission programs both for primary education (after fifth grade), and for secondary education (after seventh and eighth grades), with programs in sciences and humanities.

- Nevrokop Vocational School (NPG) "Dimitar Talev"

Nevrokop Vocational School (NPG) "Dimitar Talev" was founded in 1965 as a vocational-technical school in electro-technology. Over the years, the school grew into the School of Electrical Engineering, which provided primary staff to factories. After the democratic changes of 1989 and the subsequent closure of the plant, the school was restructured into a modern high school.

- Professional machinery high school "Peyo Yavorov"

Widely known as the Professional School of Agricultural Mechanization, "P. Yavorov" is the successor to the original agricultural school in Gotse Delchev, which was opened in 1929 with 500 acres (202 ha) of farmland. The school went through many changes over the years.

During the month of July 1959, an agricultural school was opened with the following specialties: tobacco, wine, horticulture, and animal husbandry; it was housed in the primary school. The first class included 105 students from across the country.

In 1963, the school was given 200 acres (81 ha) of farmland, and a tractor. During the academic year 1968–1969, the school was transformed into a practical agricultural school. From the academic year 1974–1975, the school grew into a vocational technical school, specializing in mechanization of agriculture. In 1983, the school moved to a new building, and in 2003 it was renamed Vocational School for Mechanization of Agriculture.

== Health care ==
Health care in the town is relatively well organized. There is municipal hospital "Dr Ivan Skenderov," which provides hospital treatment for patients from the region. The hospital has ten departments: internal medicine with cardiology unit, surgery, oto-rhino-laryngology with ophthalmology unit, trauma and orthopedics, pediatrics, neurology, nephrology with dialysis unit, obstetrics with neonatal care unit, intensive care, and infectious diseases.

In 2001, the Union of Evangelical Free Church Congregations in Germany opened a private hospital, "Symbol of Hope," for endocrine diseases, with the intention to provide affordable health services for poor people. But, after several years, the hospital closed. In 2011, the hospital reopened with different specialties: vascular surgery, orthopedics and trauma care, and mobile home care.

Two medical centers with different specialists and several general practitioners provide primary health care. There are also several dental clinics, which provide both modern and traditional services.

Emergency treatment is provided by a special state-owned unit.

== Religion ==
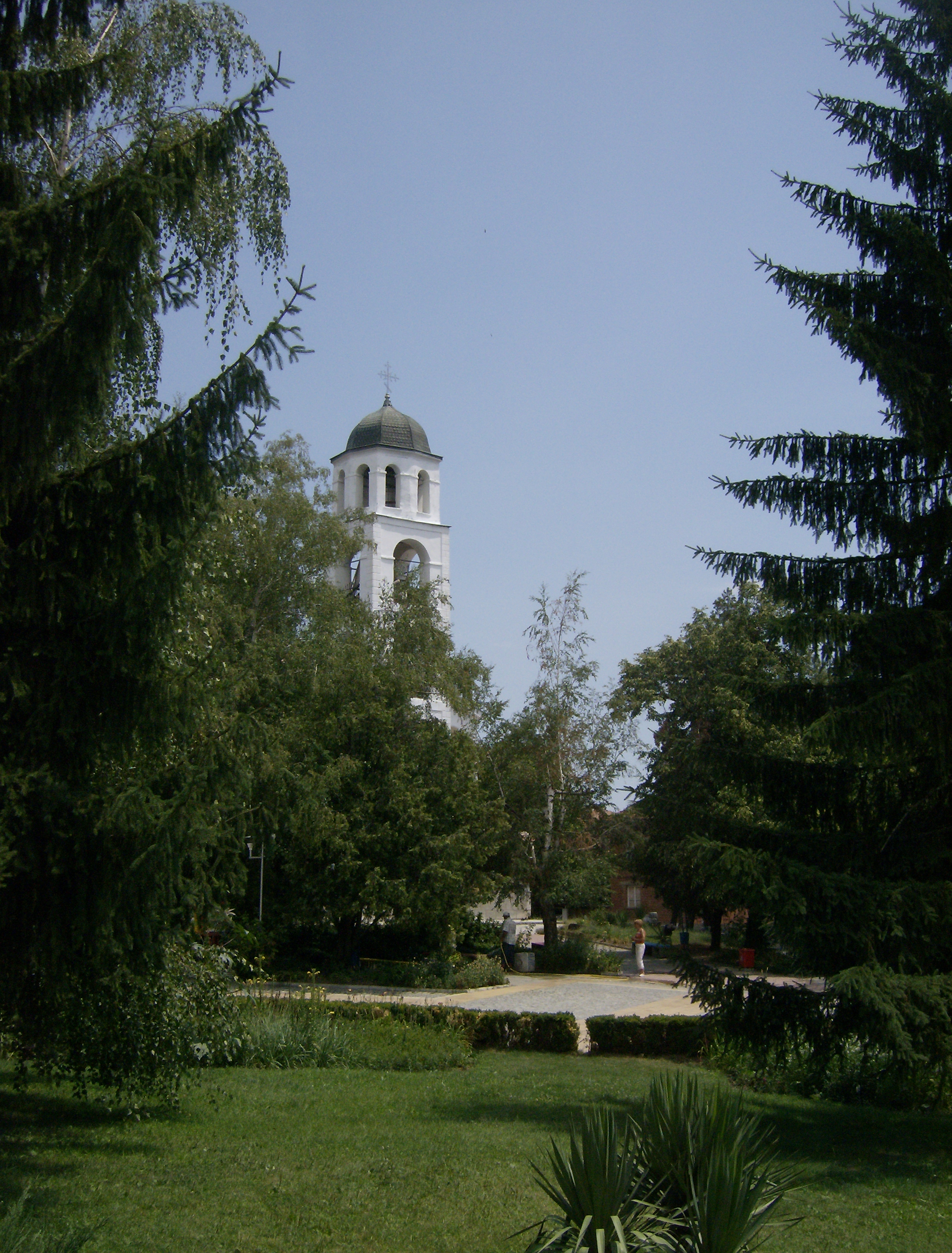
An Orthodox church in Gotse Delchev

The population of the town is predominantly Orthodox Christian. The town had been a diocesan seat of the Nevrokop Orthodox diocese, but this has been moved to Blagoevgrad, without changing the name. There are three Orthodox churches in Gotse Delchev. The Muslim population in the town has no mosque, because the only one, dating from the Ottoman period, is almost ruined. There are some plans for restoration, but so far without results. Gotse Delchev is the seat of the Regional Mufti for Blagoevgrad Province. There are also several evangelical churches in the town.

== Tourism ==
Gotse Delchev does not have any major tourist attractions, although there are several hotels and restaurants in the town. It is surrounded by three mountain formations: Pirin, the Rhodope Mountains, and Alibotush, offering scenic views. There is a historical museum in the center of the town. The village of Delchevo is of architectural interest, with old Bulgarian Renaissance houses; some of them are opened as guest-houses. The resort "Papazchair" on the road to Sandanski is open during all seasons, with opportunities for skiing. Gotse Delchev is near the ruins of the Roman town of Nicopolis ad Nestum and not far from the village of Kovachevitsa, a famous architectural reservation.

== Sport ==
PFC Pirin Gotse Delchev is soccer team that plays in the Bulgarian football league. The club was founded in 1925 and plays in the "Gradski Stadion", with a capacity of 5,000 attendees. There are also other clubs for different sports: amateur wrestling "Pirin 29A", handball, basketball, extreme sports, and karate.

== Notable people ==
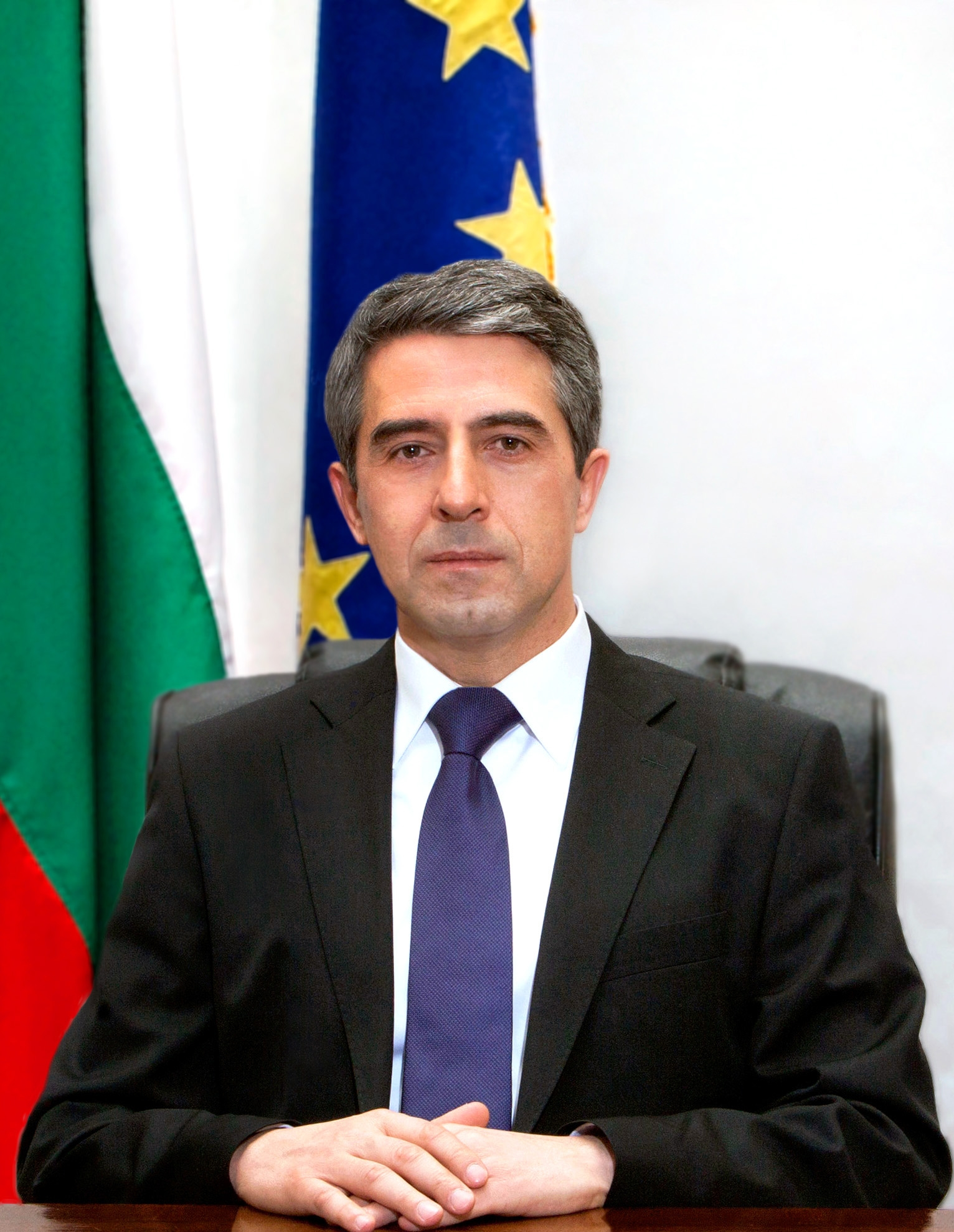
Former President of Bulgaria Rosen Plevneliev was born in the town in 1964

- Georgi Bakalov – historian
- Ilko Pirgov – footballer
- Mario Metushev – former footballer, convicted murderer
- Nikolay Dobrev (1947–1999) – politician and former Minister of the Interior of Bulgaria
- Bojidar Spiriev – statistician, author of the official IAAF scoring table
- Rosen Plevneliev – former president of Bulgaria
- Mariya Gabriel – Member of the European Parliament

== Gallery ==
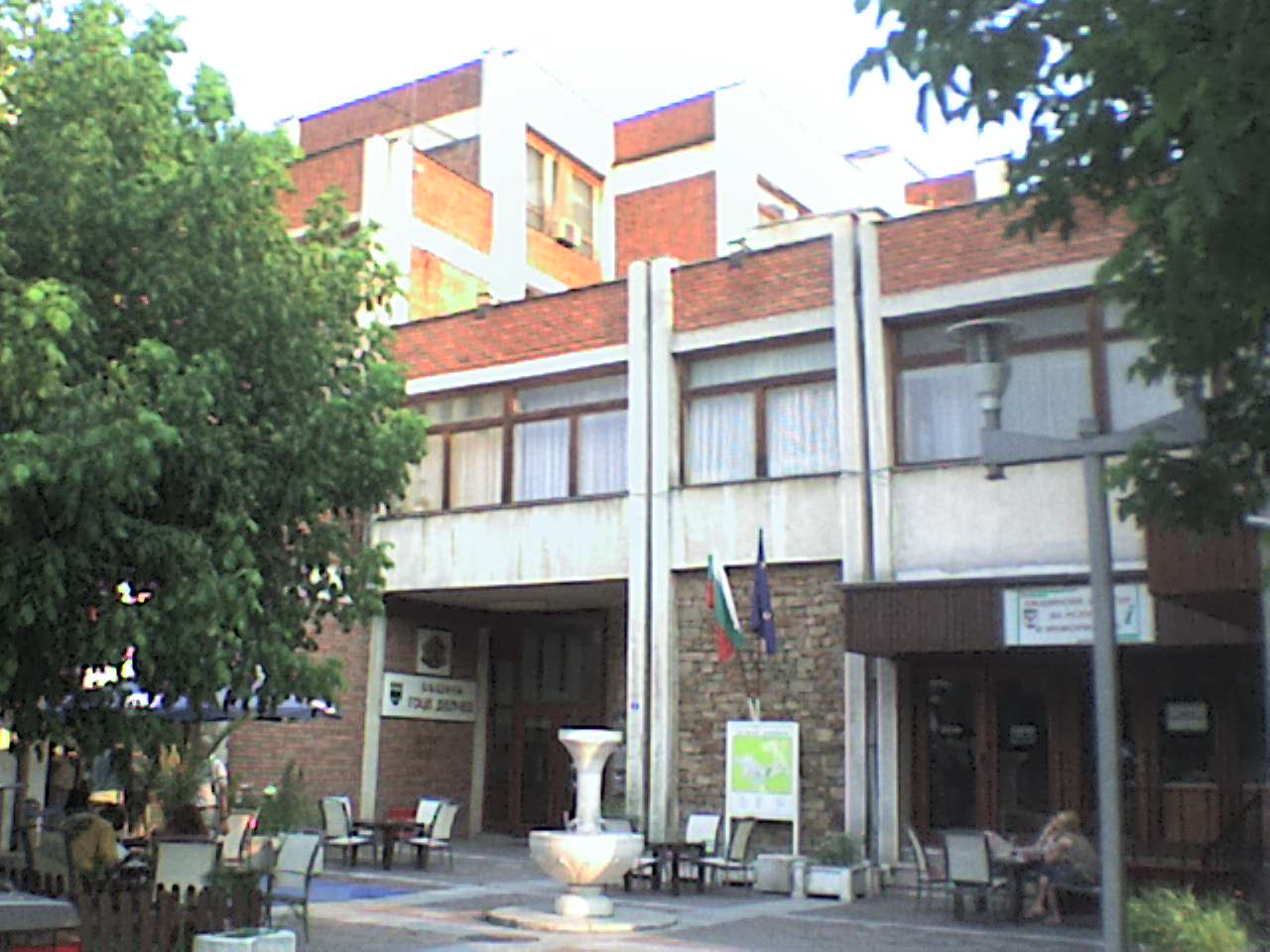
Town Council of Gotse Delchev

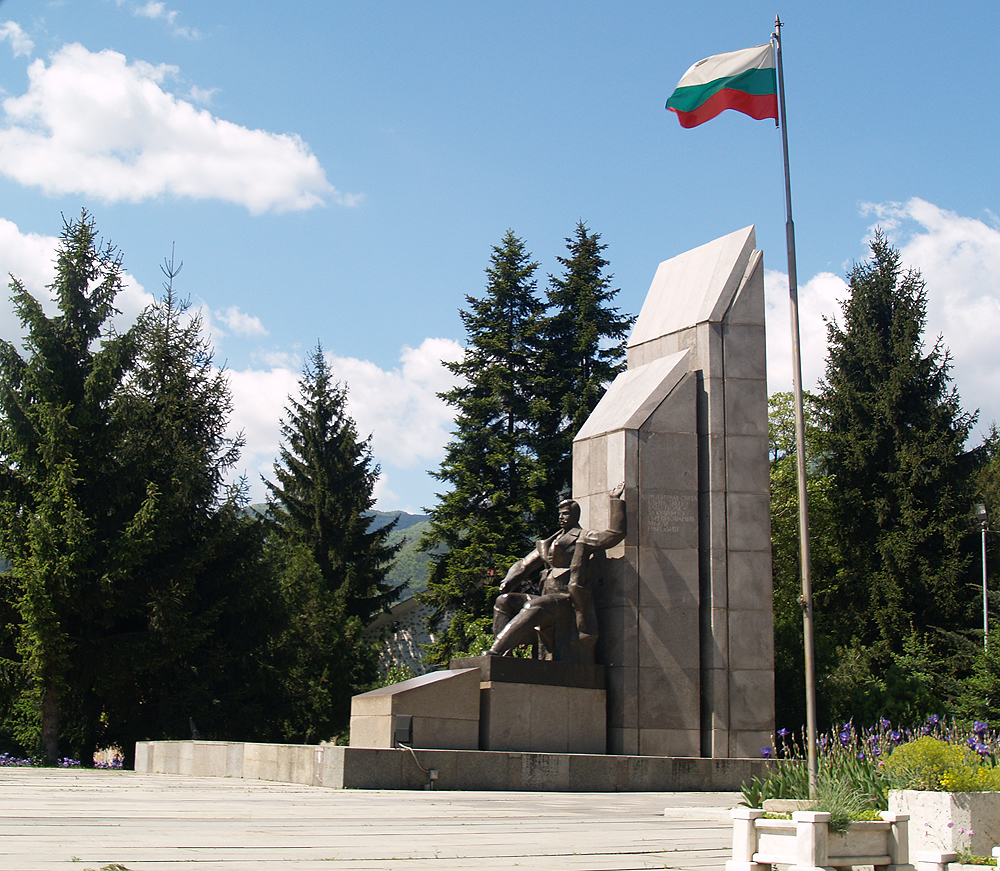
Monument to Gotse Delchev
