= Breznitsa =

Breznitsa Брезница
- Village
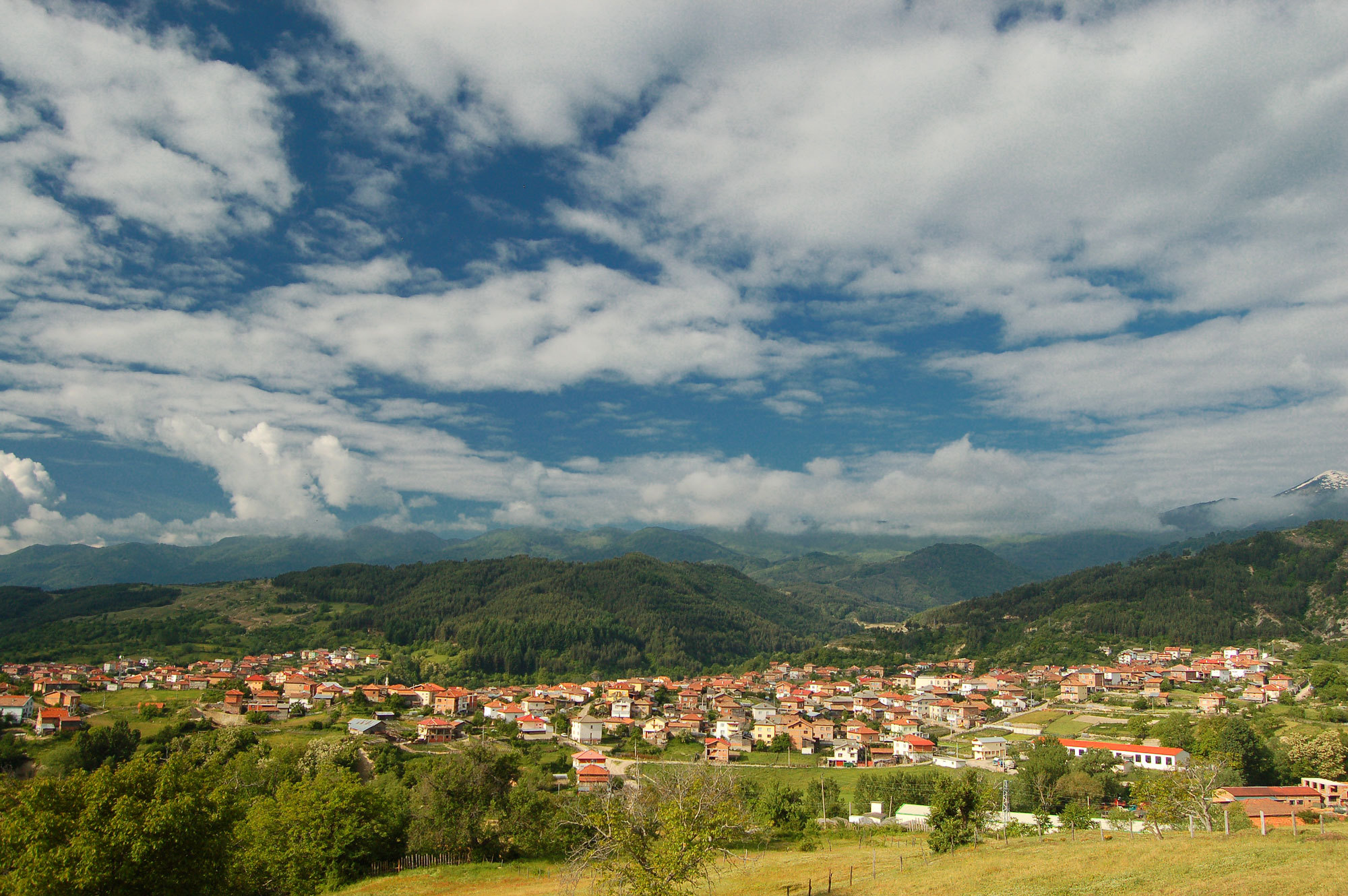

- Location within Bulgaria
- Coordinates: 41°40′N 23°40′E
- Country: Bulgaria
- Province: Blagoevgrad Province
- Municipality: Gotse Delchev

Government
  - Mayor: Isa Sakali (DPS)

Area
  - Total: 81.815 km^{2} (31.589 sq mi)
- Elevation: 715 m (2,346 ft)

Population (15-12-2011)
  - Total: 3,389
- GRAO
- Time zone: UTC+2 (EET)
  - Summer (DST): UTC+3 (EEST)
- Postal Code: 2972
- Area code: 07529

Breznitsa is a village in Gotse Delchev Municipality, in Blagoevgrad Province, Bulgaria. It is located 12 kilometers northwest of Gotse Delchev and 61 kilometers southeast of Blagoevgrad in the Pirin mountain. The Tufcha river is flowing by the village. A municipal asphalt road connects Breznitsa with the second class road Razlog - Gotse Delchev.

== History ==
The village is mentioned for first time in the Ottoman documents in 1464-1465 as a village with 78 non-Muslim households, 8 not-married people and 2 widows. Between 1498 and 1502 in another document were counted 6 Muslim households and 180 non-Muslim ones,1 non-married Muslim, 22 not-married non-Muslims and 12 widows. The growth of the population continued until 1530, when the population slightly decreased. The village became a center of a "zimaet"- a small feudal property, together with Kornitsa and Lazhnitsa. In 1689 the village was plundered. In 1723 Breznitsa was described as "a village with a mosque". In 1873 year the village was described as one with 80 households of 230 pomak people. In 1899 were counted 821 inhabitants. According to Vasil Kanchov in 1900 year counted 850 Bulgarian-Muslim people, living in 191 houses. After 1912, when the village became part of Bulgaria some Christian people from other villages, that were left outside Bulgaria came there. Remains of an Ancient and Medieval fortress are found 2 kilometers north of the village.

== Religion and ethnicity ==
Nowadays Breznitsa is a mostly Muslim village. There are a mosque and a church in the village. After the Balkan war in 1912 in the newly incorporated pomak villages the local people were forced to accept Christianity by the Bulgarian church and paramilitary formations of the Internal Macedonian Revolutionary Organization (IMRO). The process of converting did not gain results, and after the actions people returned to Islam. There were several attempts of renaming – changing the Muslim names of the pomaks with non-Muslim. The most controversial one was in the end of 1972 and the first three months of 1973, and its culmination was on March 28, 1973, when military and militia isolated the three villages Lazhnitsa, Kornitsa and Breznitsa and a serious unrest in Kornitsa led to casualties among the local people and the military both.

== Economy ==
The most important source of income for the people is the growing of tobacco, but in recent years the tobacco industry has been suffering from the restrictions of smoking in Europe. People also grow potatoes and berries. Many women from the village work in small tailoring workshops. Some young people go to search for work in the bigger towns and abroad.

== Health care and education ==
The health care in the village is provided by a general practitioner and two dentists. A secondary school "Sv Sv Kiril i Metodii" is gathering the pupils from first to twelfth grade. The school was founded in 1913 and was officially opened in 1920. In 1935 a new school building was opened. In 1966 the first wing of the present school building was finished, and in 1988 the second one was built. In 1999 the school was transformed from primary to a secondary school. There is a kindergarten with a nursery group and a cultural club, opened in 1940.

== Tourism ==
The situation of the village in the low parts of the slopes of the Pirin mountain is favorable for start point for hiking and walking routes along the Tufcha river towards the three cirque lakes "Breznishki ezera" and to the alpine parts of Pirin. There are two small caves near the village.
