= Gospodintsi =

Gospodintsi Господинци
- Village
- Location within Bulgaria
- Coordinates: 41°39′N 23°44′E
- Country: Bulgaria
- Province: Blagoevgrad Province
- Municipality: Gotse Delchev

Government
  - Mayor: Ahmed Hodzhov (DPS)

Area
  - Total: 13.353 km^{2} (5.156 sq mi)
- Elevation: 560 m (1,840 ft)

Population (15-03-2012)
  - Total: 489
- GRAO
- Time zone: UTC+2 (EET)
  - Summer (DST): UTC+3 (EEST)
- Postal Code: 2914
- Area code: 07525

Gospodintsi (before 1934: Tsiropol)is a village in Gotse Delchev Municipality, in Blagoevgrad Province, Bulgaria. It is situated on both sides of the Mesta river, 9 kilometers north of Gotse Delchev and 67 kilometers southeast of Blagoevgrad on the road Razlog - Gotse Delchev.

One kilometer east of the center have been found remains of an old fortress from the Late Antiquity. The village is mentioned in 1900 year as settlement with 270 people of pomak origin. Nowadays the population is mixed, but the Muslims are prevailing. There is a mosque and a church "St. Trinity", both of them built in the post-communist years. The health care is provided by a general practitioner. There aren't any childcare or educational facilities. The children are going to school in Banichan.
