= Gotse Delchev Municipality =

Gotse Delchev Municipality Община Гоце Делчев
- Municipality (Obshtina)
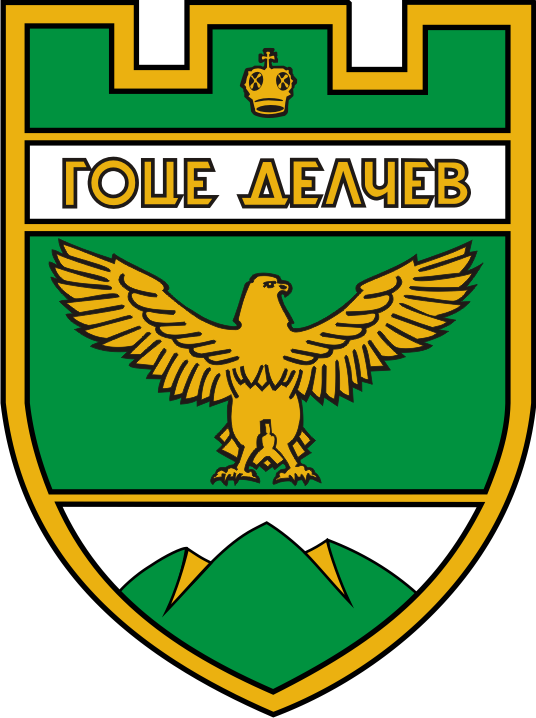
- Coat of arms

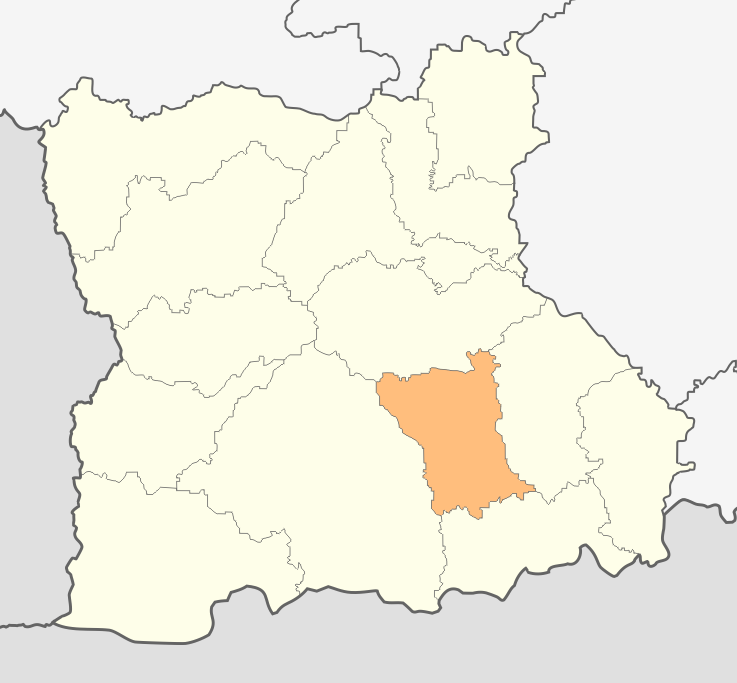
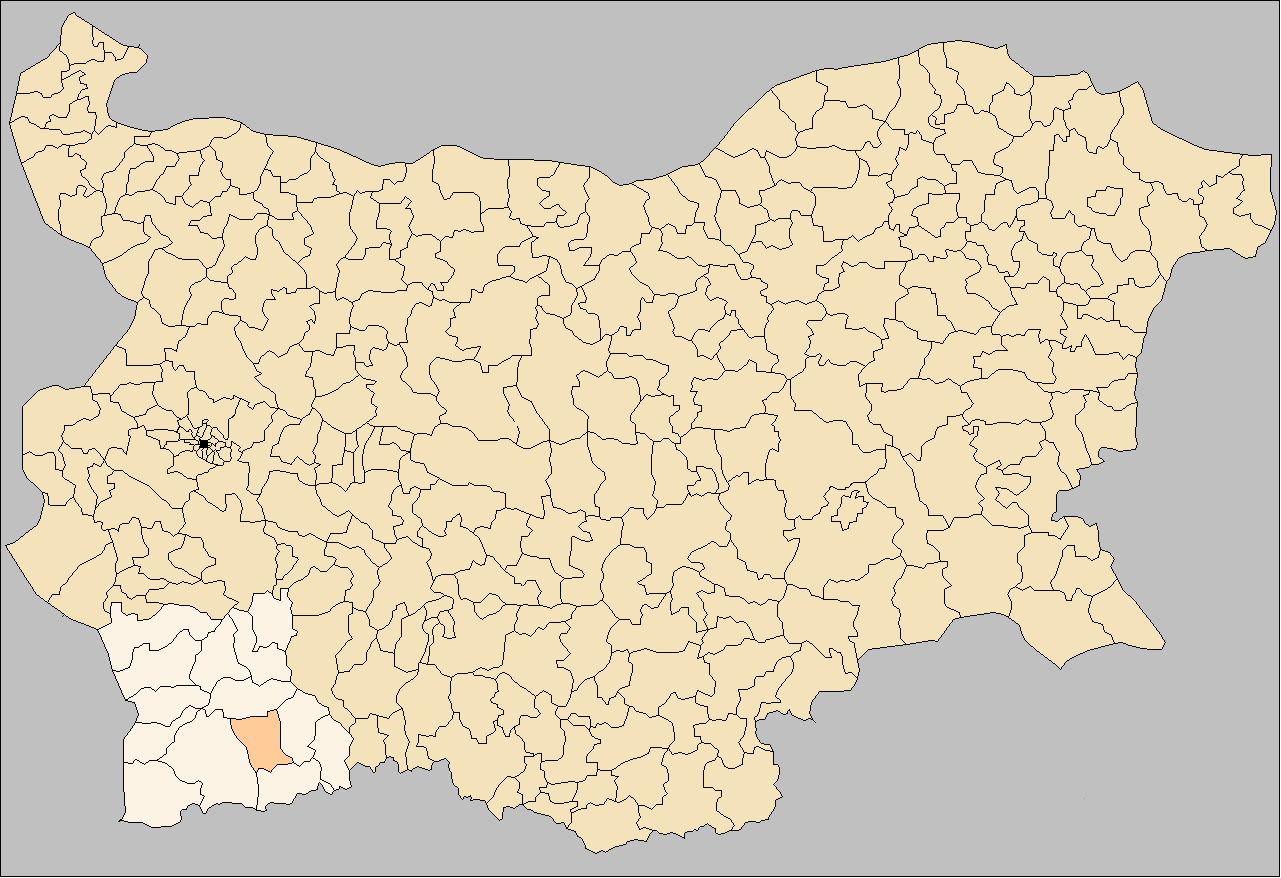
- Location in Blagoevgrad province Location on map of Bulgaria
- Coordinates: 41.5667°N 23.7333°E
- Country: Bulgaria
- Province (Oblast): Blagoevgrad
- Seat: Gotse Delchev

Government
  - Mayor: Vladimir Moskov (BSP)

Area
  - Total: 330.210 km^{2} (127.495 sq mi)
- Elevation: 508 m (1,667 ft)

Population (2011)
  - Total: 32,525
  - Density: 103/km^{2} (270/sq mi)
- Time zone: UTC+2 (EET)
  - Summer (DST): UTC+3 (EEST)
- Website: www.gotsedelchev.bg

Gotse Delchev Municipality (Bulgarian: Община Гоце Делчев, Obshtina Gotse Delchev) is a municipality in Blagoevgrad Province in Bulgaria. It is situated in the southwestern part of Bulgaria in the valley of Mesta river and the surrounding parts of Pirin and Rhodope mountains, bordering with Sandanski Municipality to the west, Bansko Municipality to the north, Garmen Municipality to the east and Hadzhidimovo Municipality to the south.

== Geography ==
Gotse Delchev Municipality is a mountainous municipality. The town and the villages of Borovo, Banichan, Gospodinci and Musomishta are lying in the valley of Mesta river. The villages Delchevo, Dobrotino, Lazhnitsa, Kornitsa and Breznitsa are in the Pirin Mountain. Bukovo is the only village in the Rhodope Mountains.

== Landscape ==
The highest point of the municipality is the peak of Chengelchal - 2709 m, located in its most northwestern part.

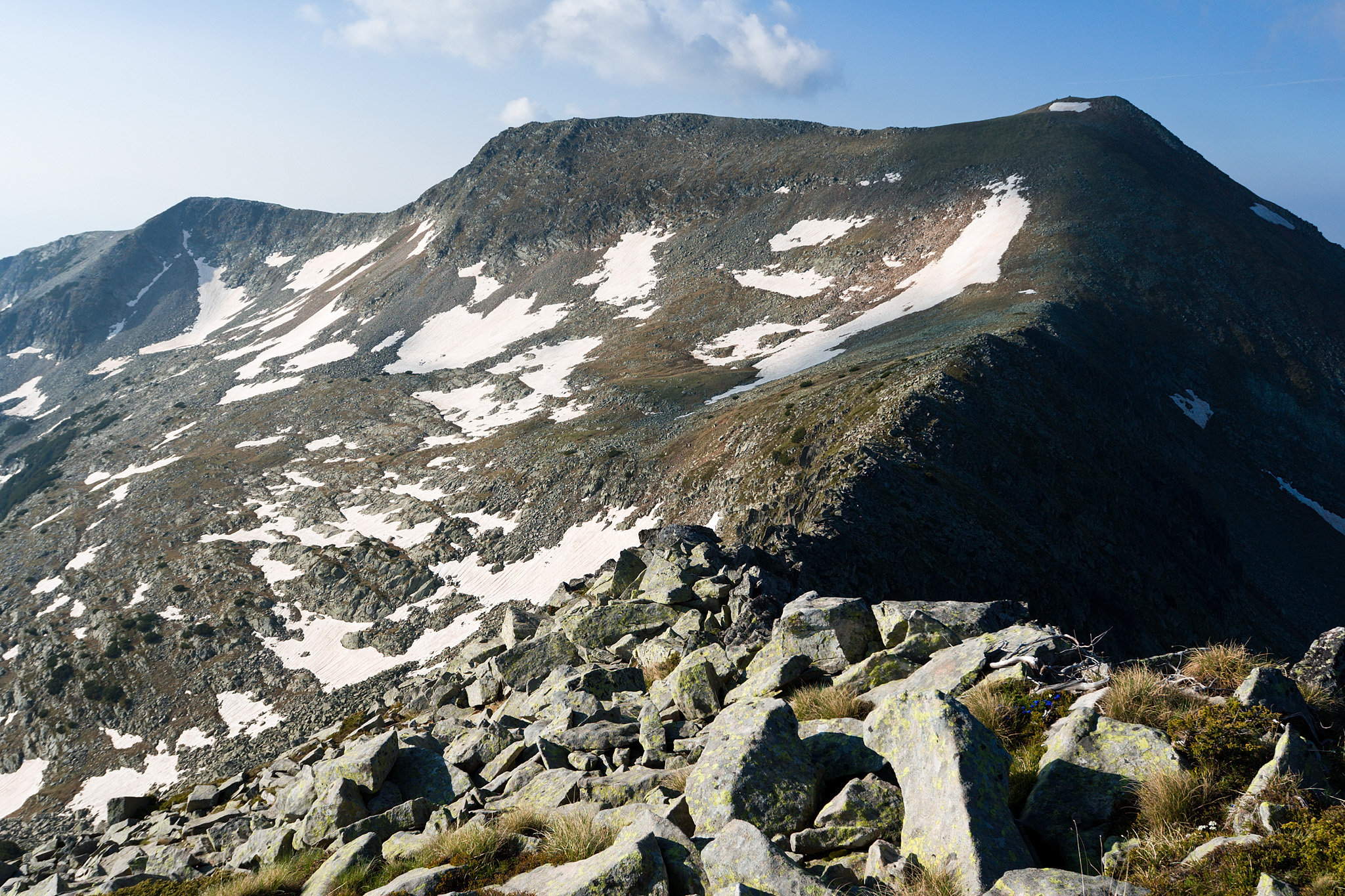
Chengelchal 2709 m

The lowest point is 430 m and is located in the Gotse Delchev valley near the town.

In the northwestern part of the municipality there are other peaks over 2600 m high and their slopes are forming cirques with lakes. In the western part is situated peak Orelek - 2099 m high and in the south are the green slopes of the mountain of Ali Botush.

== Climate ==
The climate in the municipality is Transitional Mediterranean and is depending on the altitude. The lowest parts in the valley of Mesta river are strongly influenced by the Mediterranean climatic processes. In the mountainous parts the climate is getting colder, especially higher than 2000 meters in the Pirin Mountain. The winter is mild in the Mesta river valley near the town with rainfall maximum in November. The weather is severe in the highest areas with long and snowy winter, cold spring, short summer and early autumn with high risk of avalanches in the late winter and in the spring.

== Water resources ==
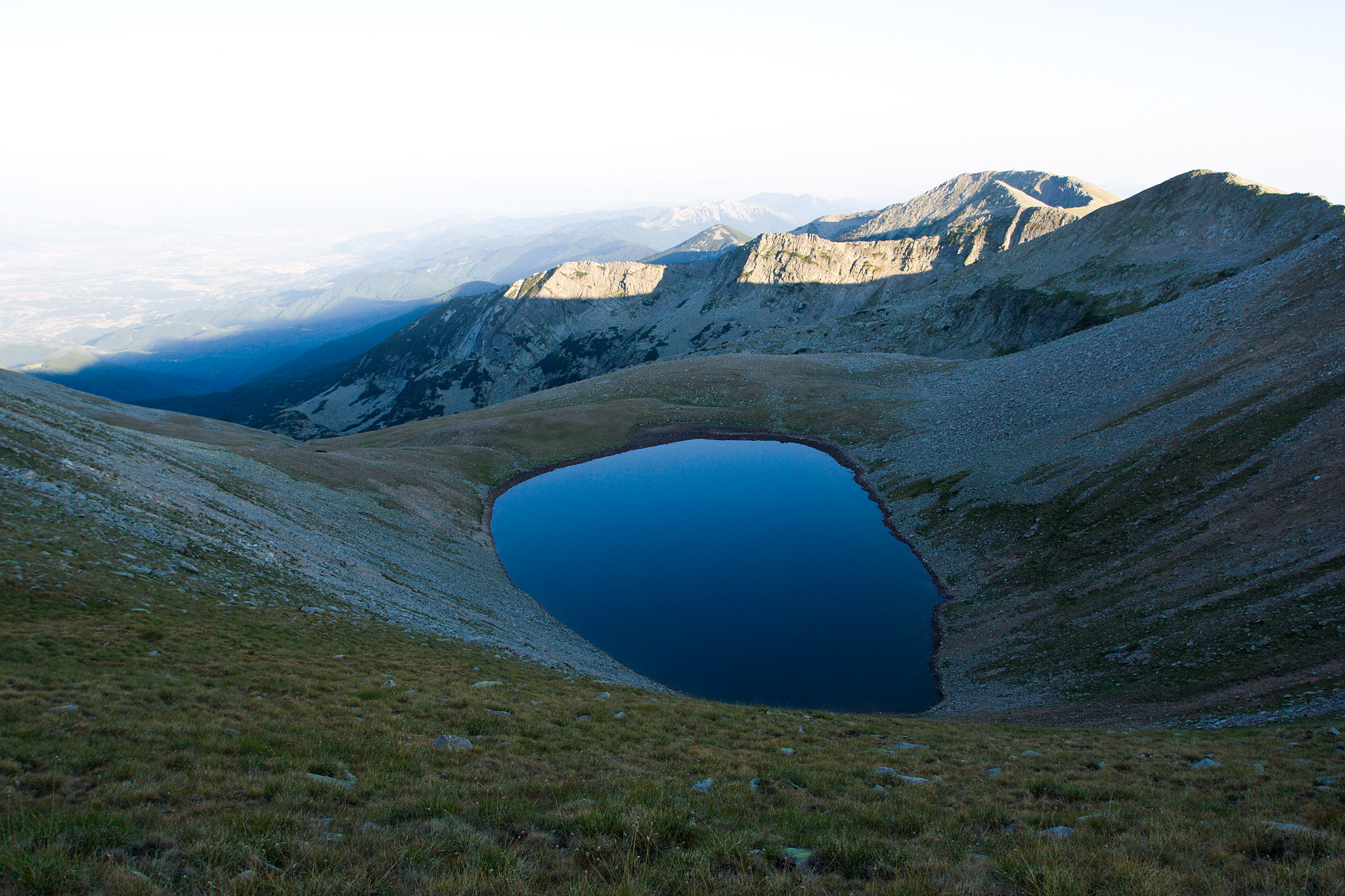
Upper Breznica lake

The main water resource is the Mesta river and its tributaries, flowing from the glacier lakes in the Breznitsa (three lakes) and Kornitsa (three small lakes) Cirques. There are also three dam lakes near the town.

== Flora and fauna ==
The lowest part of the municipality in the valley of Mesta river are turned to arable or inhabited areas. At altitude of 600–700 meters the slopes are covered with oak forests. Beech forests can be seen from 900 to 1800 meters especially under peak Orelek. Wide areas in Pirin are covered with different coniferous trees from 1500 up to 2200 meters altitude. Higher than 2000 meters dwarf pine and juniper bushes are the most common plants. The western slopes of the Rhodope Mountains are covered with different broadleaved species.

The most common wild animals are the wild boar and the roe deer in the woods. Hares and squirrels can be seen frequently. The bears are protected and their population is monitored. There are other species of animals and birds.

Part of the "National Park Pirin Mountain" is included in the municipality in its most northwestern part. Another protected area is the Natural Reservation "Orelek", located around the peak of Orelek west of the town of Gotse Delchev.

== History ==
The area was inhabited during the Thracian and Roman era. The historical town Nikopolis ad Nestum was situated on the left bank of Mesta river 7 kilometers northeast of the town near the village of Garmen, in the Garmen Municipality. Near the modern town have been unearthed remains of settlement from the 9th century. It is mentioned as an archbishopric till the 12th century. The Ottoman Turks conquered the area between 1374 and 1380.

During the first two centuries of the Ottoman rule the Muslim population increased quickly. Mosques and schools have been built. The town of Nevrokop became important trade and judicial center with many mosques, beautiful private and residential houses of the administration, according to Evliya Çelebi. In the 17th century the population decreased because of the wars and plague. The last mosque in the town was built in 1820. The first church, built in Nevrokop between 1808 and 1811 was dedicated to the Archangel Michael is known for its old Holy Gates and richly decorated fretwork ceilings and icons from 1881. In 1841 was finished the building of a bigger church - "The Assumption of Virgin Mary" with icons, painted by eminent representatives of the Bansko painting school. Churches were built in other villages of the municipality.

After the Treaty of San Stefano the whole area became part of Bulgaria, but after the Treaty of Berlin the region was returned under Ottoman rule. In 1894 was erected the Bulgarian Orthodox bishopric of Nevrokop with a seat in Nevrokop. In 1903 the region took part in the Ilinden–Preobrazhenie Uprising. During the First Balkan War volunteers joined Macedonian-Adrianopolitan Volunteer Corps. After the war the region left in Bulgaria. Most of the Greek population fled to Greece. Some Turkish and Muslim people also moved out. Refugees from the parts of Macedonia, that were left outside Bulgaria came to live here, so the ethnic character of the population changed. There was a process of forced converting of the Muslim people in The Bulgarian part of Macedonia to the Christianity, sponsored and inspired by the Bulgarian government and Bulgarian Orthodox Church and performed by IMRO, but with no actual further results. In 1922 forces of the Macedonian Federative Organization with the support of the Bulgarian government attacked the IMRO local detachments. As result of this unrest on October 17 Nevrokop was occupied by forces of IMRO, who banished the Federalists, but with no further serious consequences. In the years of the Bulgarian resistance movement during World War II a formation led by Aneshti Uzunov operated in the region. After his death in 1943 it was named after him. After the Bulgarian coup d'état of 1944 many activists of IMRO from the area were assassinated or imprisoned or fled abroad. In 1951 Nevrokop was renamed after the revolutionary Gotse Delchev.

After the Second World War the process of conversion of the pomak people and eliminating the influence of the Islam in the region continued with changing temps. On March 28, 1973 in the village of Kornitsa armed forces of the Militia and the Army attempted to occupy the village and met organized resistance from the local people and there were casualties from the both sides.

== Population ==
The urbanization in the municipality resulted of the decreasing of the population in the smaller villages and in the whole municipality. The town of Gotse Delchev lost its importance with the development of Blagoevgrad as the administrative, cultural and educational center in Southwestern Bulgaria. After the opening of the road connection with Greece the region returned some of its assets and the increased traffic resulted road improvement and flourishing of the road-side villages.

| Town/Village | Area (km^{2}) | Population |
|---|---|---|
| Gotse Delchev (Гоце Делчев) | 21.652 | 20,551 |
| Banichan (Баничан) | 13.100 | 579 |
| Borovo (Борово) | 10.348 | 1,058 |
| Breznitsa (Брезница) | 81.815 | 3,389 |
| Bukovo (Буково) | 16.593 | 937 |
| Delchevo (Делчево) | 28.318 | 51 |
| Dobrotino (Добротино) | 22.620 | 47 |
| Gospodintsi (Господинци) | 13.353 | 490 |
| Kornitsa (Корница) | 63.584 | 1,591 |
| Lazhnitsa (Лъжница) | 25.966 | 1,529 |
| Musomishta (Мусомища) | 32.861 | 2,303 |
| Total | 330.21 | 32,525 |

=== Religion ===
According to the latest Bulgarian census of 2011, the religious composition, among those who answered the optional question on religious identification, was the following:

Religious composition of Gotse Delchev Municipality
| Orthodox Christianity | 65.1% |
| Catholicism | 0.1% |
| Protestantism | 0.4% |
| Islam | 31.4% |
| No religion | 0.5% |
| Prefer not to answer, others and indefinable | 2.5% |

== Transportation and infrastructure ==
There are 80 kilometers national and municipal roads in the municipality. The most important and busy is the second class road from Simitli to the border crossing Ilinden with Greece going from north to south with length of 25 kilometers in the municipality. The third class road between Petrich and Satovcha is crossing the municipality with length of 24 kilometers in the municipality from west to east and is connected with the road to Greece near the town of Gotse Delchev. The fourth class municipal roads are connecting the villages with the main roads. There are no other types of transport in the municipality. Regular bus lines connect the villages in the municipality with the town of Gotse Delchev. There are regular lines to Sofia, Blagoevgrad, Hadzhidimovo, Satovcha and the villages of Garmen Municipality. All the settlements have central electricity and water supply. Fixed phone lines and Internet are also widely available. All national mobile operators cover the area.

== Economy ==
The municipality has been isolated from the big industrial centers in Bulgaria due to its geographic location near the closed border with Greece for about sixty years and the lack of natural resources, the long distances between Gotse Delchev and other bigger towns and the narrow and poorly maintained roads. After the opening of the Ilinden-Exochi border-crossing and improving the road system in the area the economy of the municipality changed. The light industry is well presented, especially in the town of Gotse Delchev. The textile and shoe industry, zippers producing, plastics processing, paper industry, wood industry and wood processing, tobacco growing and processing are the major sources of the income of the municipality. There aren't industrial subjects in the mountainous villages.

== Agriculture, forestry and stock-breeding ==
The Mediterranean influence in the wide valley of the Mesta river is favorable for modern and productive agriculture in the municipality. Tobacco was the most important culture in the recent years and presented large part of agriculture of the municipality, especially in the villages, but now there is a decline in the production due to the worldwide restrictions against smoking and the change of the state policy of subsidies for the produced tobacco. People also grow wheat, maize for grain, beans, sunflowers, potatoes, tomatoes, peppers, apples, vineyards, strawberries, raspberries, blackberries and other fruits.

Forests cover 60% of the municipality's territory.

People breed cattle in the valleys and sheep and goats in the mountainous parts. There are bee gardens with more than 2100 bee hives. There aren't any dairy or meat processing factories in the municipality.

== Education and children care ==
There are ten kindergartens and one nursery in the municipality. Five of the kindergartens are combined with nursery groups. Three of the kindergarten are in the villages. Fourteen schools, all of them state-owned are working in the municipality - 9 primary schools, 1 general secondary school, 1 specialized in mathematics and sciences high school, 2 professional high schools and a school for children with special needs. There is also a home for children without parents' care for children in school age. In some of the community centers are organized arts and language schools for extra-circular education.

== Health care ==
The municipality has a developed health care system. There is a regional hospital "Dr Ivan Skenderov" with medical center, providing emergent and scheduled treatment. Many different specialists work there. There are also general practitioners in Gotse Delchev and in most of the villages. Over twenty specialist in dental medicine work in the town and in the surrounding villages.

== Culture and arts ==
Gotse Delchev region is famous with two folk ensembles and the singer Nikolina Chakardakova, who perform nationwide and abroad the traditional folklore of the region and from other Bulgarian folklore regions. There are other smaller or children's groups, who preserve the songs and the traditions in the municipality. Nine cultural clubs with public libraries are opened in the town and in the villages. The House of culture in Gotse Delchev, built in 1998 is the biggest cultural center in the region. There is a concert hall with 600 seats and a gallery.

The Municipal Historical Museum is set in a Bulgarian Baroque style house, built in 1877, with traditional wood-carved fretworks on the ceilings and the doors. The exposition is contained in 12 halls - archaeological, historical and ethnographic. A Thracian chariot and objects from Nicopolis ad Nestum are brought there from Garmen Municipality. Tools, costumes, ritual fabrics, embroideries, jewellery and musical instruments from the region are exhibited. The exhibition present the products of the traditional crafts such as: bell-making, weaving, coppersmithery and goldsmithery, pottery, goat's-hair and wool weaving and tailoring and saddle-making.

During May every year in Gotse Delchev is taking part the Festival of the Classic Guitar and many performers from Bulgaria and abroad gather to perform there.

== Tourism ==
There are several hotels in Gotse Delchev and in the resort Papazchair (Popovi livadi). There is also a tourist dormitory and several mountain huts. The village of Delchevo is an architectural reservation. The tourist may visit the peak Orelek or to go the highest parts in Pirin. Tourists shall be well prepared and equipped and to check the current weather in the highest parts and to follow the signs and beware of avalanches.

== Sport ==
The football club Pirin, established in 1925, now is playing in the first division. There are also several amateur football clubs in the villages. Women's handball, wrestling and karate clubs are the other sport activities in the municipality.
