= Lazhnitsa =

Lazhnitsa Лъжница
- Village
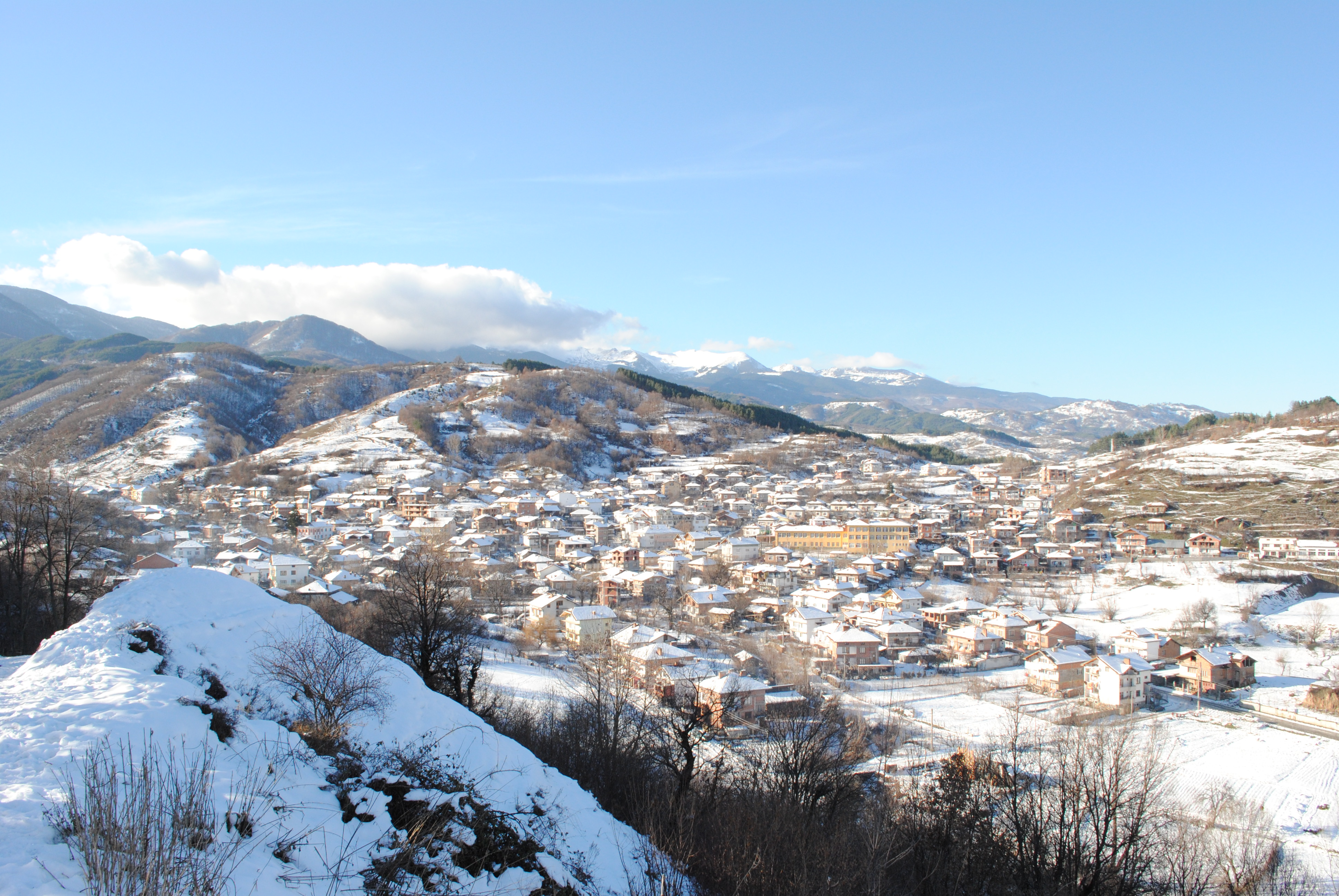

- Location within Bulgaria
- Coordinates: 41°37′N 23°41′E
- Country: Bulgaria
- Province: Blagoevgrad Province
- Municipality: Gotse Delchev

Government
  - Mayor: Zaafer Koinarov (DPS)

Area
  - Total: 25.966 km^{2} (10.026 sq mi)
- Elevation: 692 m (2,270 ft)

Population (15-03-2012)
  - Total: 1,660
- GRAO
- Time zone: UTC+2 (EET)
  - Summer (DST): UTC+3 (EEST)
- Postal Code: 2971
- Area code: 07520

Lazhnitsa is a village in Gotse Delchev Municipality, in Blagoevgrad Province, Bulgaria. It is situated in the foothills of the Pirin mountain, 7 kilometers northwest of Gotse Delchev and 65 kilometers southeast of Blagoevgrad.

== History ==
The village is mentioned for first time in the Ottoman documents in 1478 year as a village with 101 non-Muslim households and 3 Turkmen-Muslim households. In 1873 were counted 75 households with 175 inhabitants of Pomak origin. In 1899 the village is described as one with population of 429.

After the First Balkan War the village together with the whole region of Nevrokop joined Bulgaria and was subject of ethnic and religious changes due to the migration after the war. Almost all of the Greek and the majority of the Turkish population fled from the area and many Bulgarian Christian and some Bulgarian Muslim people came from the parts of Macedonia, left outside the Bulgarian border. The local population of Bulgarian Muslims, however, continued to present the vast majority of the rural population, including the village of Lazhnitsa. Immediately after becoming part of Bulgaria, forces of IMRO with the assistance of the Bulgarian Orthodox Church started a process of enforced conversion of the Pomak population to Christianity and changing of their Islamic names. There were 200 Pomak households in Lazhnitsa in the end of 1912. The campaign led to no significant results after those actions, because the local people returned to their old names and religion in the recent months. There has been several other attempts of conversion – in 1917 and in 1942. After 1944 the conversion ceased for a while, but in 1956 a new strategy has been formed about the "national awareness of the Bulgarian Muslims". On March 28, 1973 in the village of Kornitsa armed forces of the Militia and the Army attempted to occupy the village and met organized resistance from the local people and there were casualties from both sides. People from Lazhnitsa were notified about those actions by fire signals and many of them marched toward Kornitsa to help to the local people there, but they were stopped by the armed forces, before reaching Kornitsa. The policy towards changing the Islamic names and diminishing the influence of the Islamic religion led to restrictions on the traditional clothing, especially of the women. On December 29, 1989 year the new Bulgarian government officially ceased the assimilation and returned the old names.

== Economy ==
After 1989, some people migrated to Turkey or Western Europe. Tobacco growing was the traditional source of income in the past, but in recent years it is in decline, so other agricultural activities slowly take its place, like sheep rearing and cow breeding. Nowadays general source of income came from light industry and in particular from the 7 sewing workshops that operate in the village. There are several cafeterias, shops and a fast food restaurant. The village is known with its construction workers which have been working on different big buildings in the country.

== Religion ==
The people in the village are Muslims of Pomak origin. There is a mosque in the village, which had been renovated in recent years with donations from local businessman and local people.

== Institutions ==
The village is governed by a Mayor and as part of the Gotse Delchev Municipality by the Mayor of the municipality. There is a United school "Petar Beron", teaching the students from 1st to 10th grade with adjoined kindergarten group. In 2018 work on a nursery school was finished. A community center with a public library "Yane Sandanski" is also home of amateur men and women groups for authentic folklore songs. The health care is provided by a general practitioner. There are grocery stores, a cafe and a bakery for bread.
