= Bojidar Spiriev =

Bulgarian engineer and athletics statistician (1932–2010)

Bojidar Spiriev (Bulgarian: Божидар Спириев; 1932–2010) was a Bulgarian hydrogeological engineer and athletics statistician credited with the creation of the official IAAF Scoring Tables in Athletics.

== Biography ==
Spiriev was born in Nevrokop (today Gotse Delchev), a town in southwestern Bulgaria. He married Hungarian long jump champion Irén Kun in 1961 and moved to Hungary. However, it was not until 1992 that he was granted Hungarian citizenship. He is the father of former athlete and athletics manager Attila and chess player Peter.

Spiriev created the "Hungarian" Scoring Tables of Athletics in 1979, which later turned into the official IAAF Scoring Tables. Together with Attila, they created the World Rankings system in athletics. They also founded All-Athletics.com, a comprehensive worldwide athletics database website.

Spiriev died on 10 January 2010 at the age of 77.
