= Bukovo, Vologda Oblast =

Bukovo Буково
- Village
- Location within Vologda Oblast Location within Russia
- Coordinates: 60°36′N 46°44′E
- Country: Russia
- Region: Vologda Oblast
- District: Velikoustyugsky District
- Time zone: UTC+3:00

Bukovo (Russian: Буково) is a rural locality (a village) in Pokrovskoye Rural Settlement, Velikoustyugsky District, Vologda Oblast, Russia. The population was 7 as of 2002.

== Geography ==
Bukovo is located 33 km southeast of Veliky Ustyug (the district's administrative centre) by road. Ilyinskoye is the nearest rural locality.
