= Bukowo (disambiguation) =

Bukowo is an administrative neighborhood in Poland.

Bukowo may also refer to:

- Bukowo, Opole Voivodeship (south-west Poland)
- Bukowo, Podlaskie Voivodeship (north-east Poland)
- Bukowo, Człuchów County in Pomeranian Voivodeship (north Poland)
- Bukowo, Kartuzy County in Pomeranian Voivodeship (north Poland)
- Bukowo, Sztum County in Pomeranian Voivodeship (north Poland)
- Bukowo, Warmian-Masurian Voivodeship (north Poland)
- Bukowo, Białogard County in West Pomeranian Voivodeship (north-west Poland)
- Bukowo, Kołobrzeg County in West Pomeranian Voivodeship (north-west Poland)
- Bukowo, Koszalin County in West Pomeranian Voivodeship (north-west Poland)
- Bukowo, Wałcz County in West Pomeranian Voivodeship (north-west Poland)
