= Delchevo, Blagoevgrad Province =

Delchevo Делчево
- Village
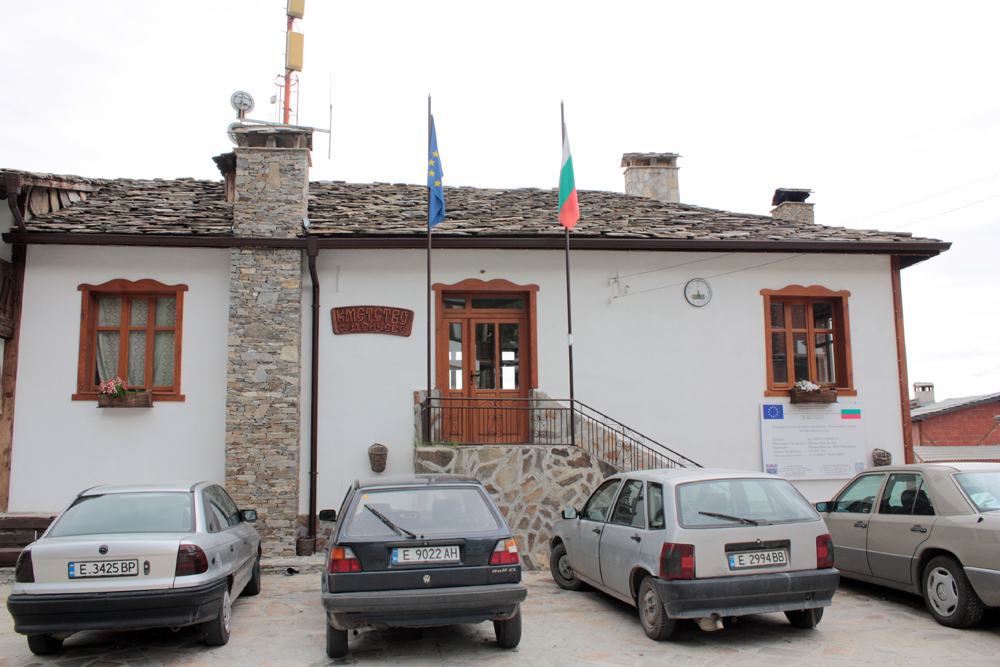

- Location within Bulgaria
- Coordinates: 41°33′N 23°42′E
- Country: Bulgaria
- Province: Blagoevgrad Province
- Municipality: Gotse Delchev

Government
  - Suffragan mayor: Ivan Panayotov

Area
  - Total: 28.318 km^{2} (10.934 sq mi)
- Elevation: 1,024 m (3,360 ft)

Population (15-03-2012)
  - Total: 49
- GRAO
- Time zone: UTC+2 (EET)
  - Summer (DST): UTC+3 (EEST)
- Postal Code: 2917
- Website: http://www.pirin-delchevo.eu/

Delchevo (before 1934:Yuch duruk) is a village in Gotse Delchev Municipality, in Blagoevgrad Province, Bulgaria. The village is 3 kilometers southwest of Gotse Delchev and about 600 m higher in the Pirin mountain, 71 kilometers southeast of Blagoevgrad and is connected with the town of Gotse Delchev by a steep 8 kilometers long mountainous road, accessible during the whole year. There are a few permanent residents in the village. The only source of income is the touristic business. There aren't any industrial subjects in the village. The village has no school or community center.

Remains of the Roman period have been unearthed and they are evidences of the long history of the settlement. The contemporary village has been found in the 17th century.

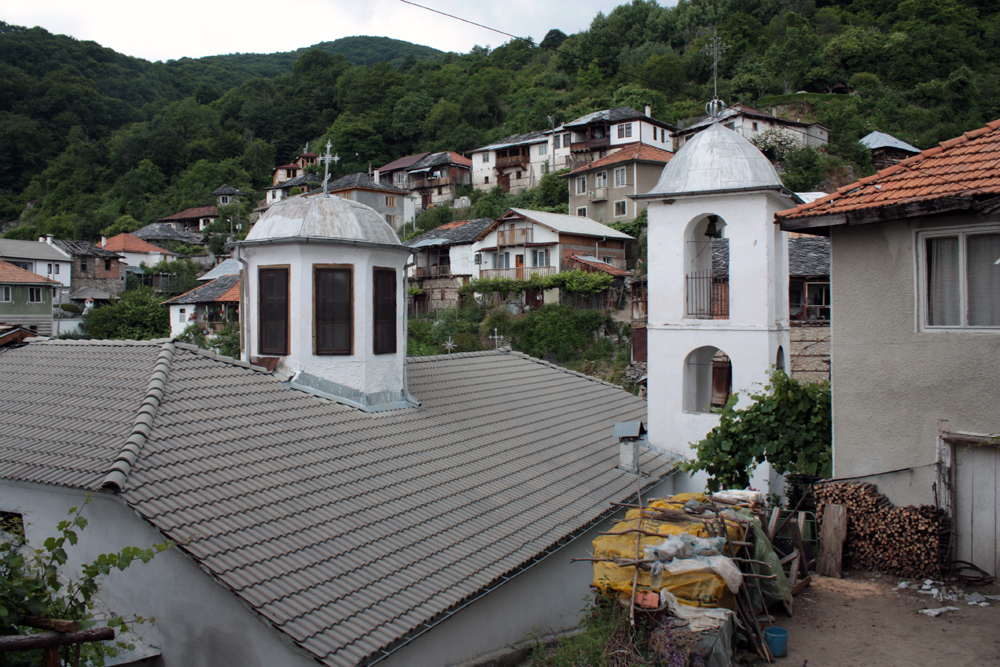

In 1838, the Assumption church was built. In 1873, 69 households were counted with 250 Bulgarian people. Tobacco growing and livestock farming were the major sources of income. There were also some trading and crafts because of the favorable climate and location near the larger town of Nevrokop.

People in the village took part of the preparation of the Ilinden–Preobrazhenie Uprising and many were killed. In 1908-1909 126 households were counted with 613 Bulgarians. In 1912 the village became part of Bulgaria and in 1934 was named Delchevo. During the second half of the 20th century the population declined and the village was almost abandoned.

At the beginning of the 21st century, Delchevo became one of the fastest developing centers for countryside tourism in Bulgaria. Many of the houses, built in the 19th century, were restored or renewed. 27 of them are declared "architectural monuments of national importance". Because of the location in the Pirin mountains on a steep southeastern slope, the amphitheatrically situated houses offer views of the Rhodope Mountains, the valley of the Mesta river, and the town of Gotse Delchev. More than 10 guest-houses and a number of restaurants, offer traditional and European cuisine.

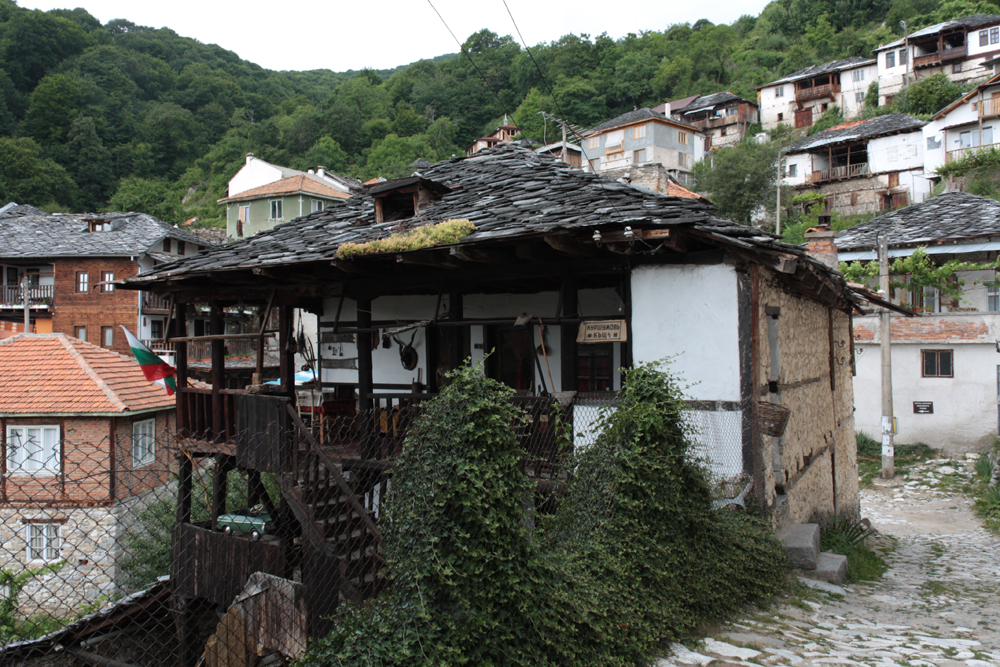

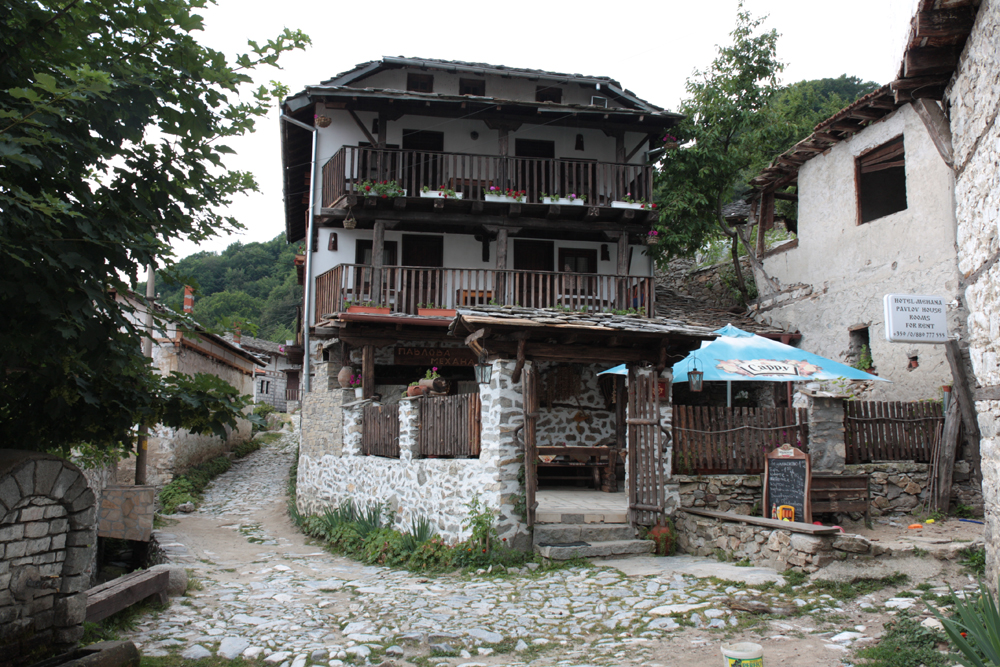

There are several festivals, preserving the traditions of the region, happening during the year.
