= Bukovo, Blagoevgrad Province =

Bukovo Буково
- Village
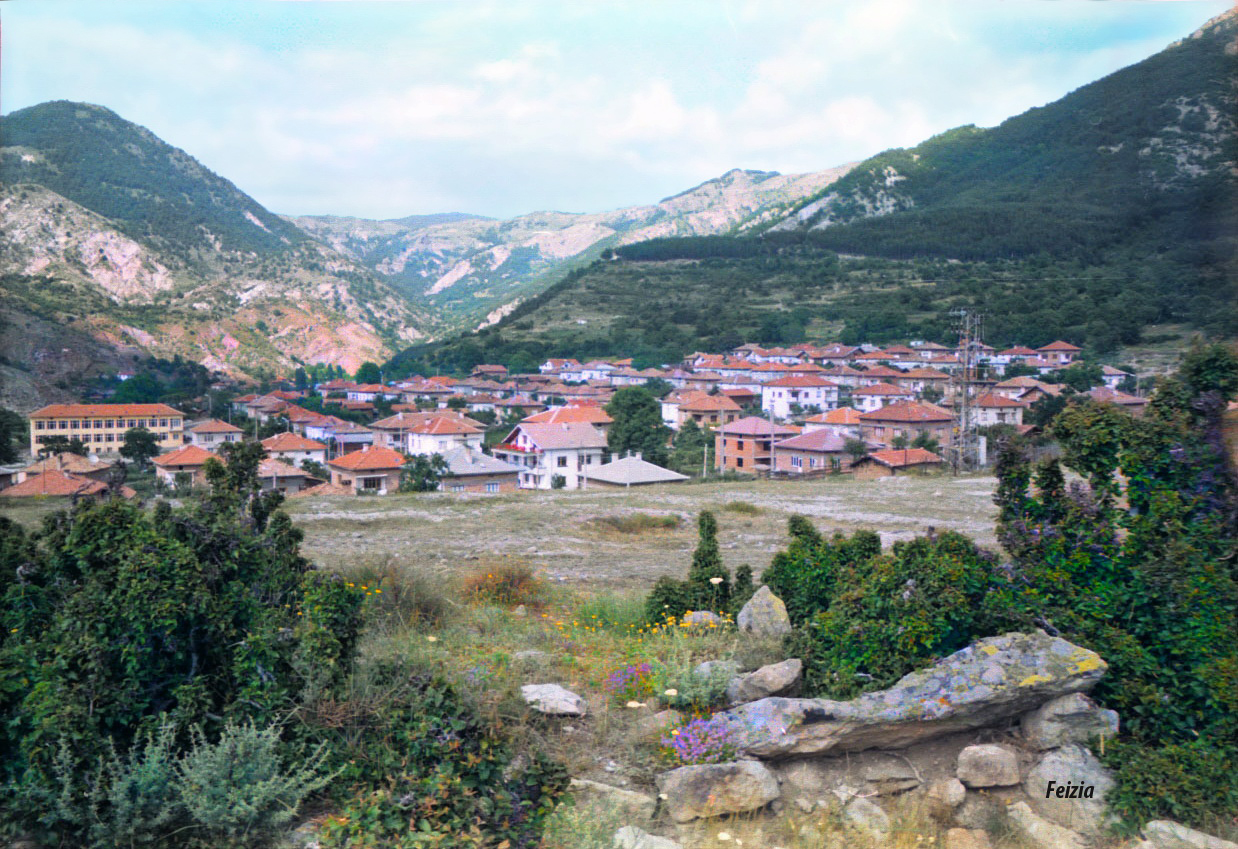

- Location within Bulgaria
- Coordinates: 41°43′N 23°43′E
- Country: Bulgaria
- Province: Blagoevgrad Province
- Municipality: Gotse Delchev

Government
  - Mayor: Shukri Musli (DPS)

Area
  - Total: 16.593 km^{2} (6.407 sq mi)
- Elevation: 1,021 m (3,350 ft)

Population (2012-03-15)
  - Total: 936
- GRAO
- Time zone: UTC+2 (EET)
  - Summer (DST): UTC+3 (EEST)
- Postal Code: 2915
- Area code: 07532

Bukovo, Blagoevgrad Province is the northernmost village in Gotse Delchev Municipality, in Blagoevgrad Province, Bulgaria. The village is the only one settlement in the municipality, situated in the Rhodope Mountains. It is accessible by a mountainous road from the main road Razlog - Gotse Delchev. There is a branch of a clothing factory in the village. People grow tobacco and this is the main source of income. The health care in the village is provided by two general-practitioners. There is a primary school "Ivan Vazov" with an adjusted kindergarten group. The people are Muslims of pomak origin and there is a mosque in the village. The remains of the fortress "Momina kula" are nearby the village.
