= Banichan =

Banichan Баничан
- Village
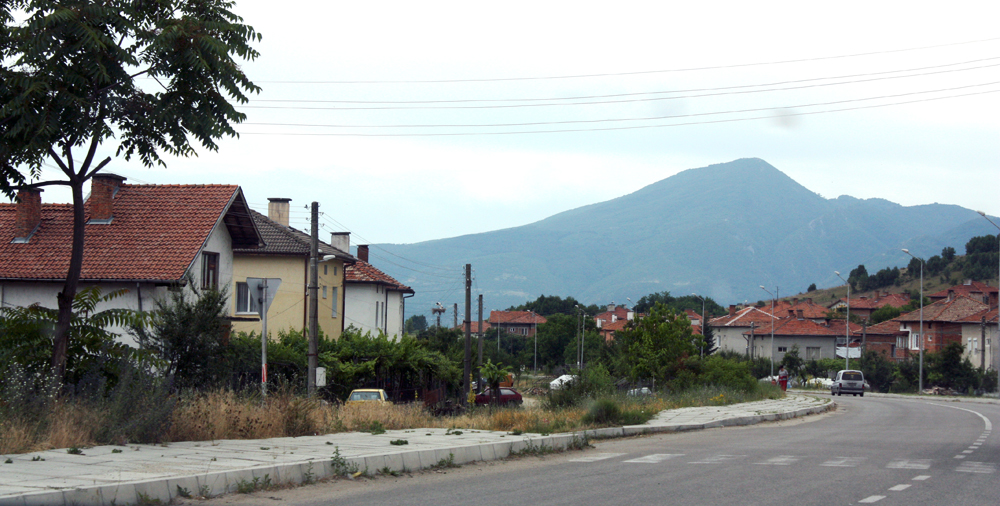

- Location within Bulgaria
- Coordinates: 41°37′N 23°44′E
- Country: Bulgaria
- Province: Blagoevgrad Province
- Municipality: Gotse Delchev

Government
  - Mayor: Elena Sivrieva (SDS)

Area
  - Total: 13.1 km^{2} (5.1 sq mi)
- Elevation: 508 m (1,667 ft)

Population (15-12-2011)
  - Total: 579
- Time zone: UTC+2 (EET)
  - Summer (DST): UTC+3 (EEST)
- Postal Code: 2905
- Area code: 07525

Banichan is a village in Gotse Delchev Municipality, in Blagoevgrad Province, Bulgaria. The village is situated alongside the second class road Razlog - Gotse Delchev - Drama, Greece. The village is located 69 kilometers southwest of Blagoevgrad and 6 kilometers north of Gotse Delchev on the right bank of Mesta river.

The village has long history. The first village was built near the thermal spring in Roman times. During the Ottoman rule the village moved to the slopes of the Pirin mountain, where now is the old village. A medieval monastery, believed to be destroyed during the Ottoman rule was rebuilt in the beginning of the 20th century. In 1864 was built a church dedicated to Saint Archangel Michael. Another church dedicated to Saint Athanasius the Great was built in the village later. Nowadays there are five churches in the village, and a new one, sixth is being built now. The contemporary village is built alongside the road to Gotse Delchev and closer to Mesta river. Another river - the Tufcha, draining the Breznitsa lakes is flowing in the north part of the village. There is a primary school "St Paisii Hilendarski", gathering the children from the village and from the neighboring Gospodintsi. The health care is provided by a general practitioner.
