= Mosomishte =

Mosomishte Мосомище
- Village
- Location within Bulgaria
- Coordinates: 41°33′N 23°45′E
- Country: Bulgaria
- Province: Blagoevgrad Province
- Municipality: Gotse Delchev

Government
  - Mayor: Todor Libyahovski (Ind.)

Area
  - Total: 32.861 km^{2} (12.688 sq mi)
- Elevation: 513 m (1,683 ft)

Population (15-03-2012)
  - Total: 2,285
- GRAO
- Time zone: UTC+2 (EET)
  - Summer (DST): UTC+3 (EEST)
- Postal Code: 2920
- Area code: 0751

Mosomishte is a village in Gotse Delchev Municipality, in Blagoevgrad Province, Bulgaria. It is situated in the valley of Gotse Delchev, just 2 kilometers south-southeast of the town of Gotse Delchev and 75 kilometers southeast of Blagoevgrad.

== History ==
The village is mentioned for first time in 1478 in the Ottoman documents as a village with 158 non-Muslim households and 5 Turk-Muslim households. In 1873 in the village there were 93 households with 50 male Muslims and 260 male Bulgarians. In 1900 year Vasil Kanchov describes Musomishta as a village with 523 Bulgarian Christians and 100 Muslim Turks. In 1909 in the village there were 90 Bulgarian households with 450 people and 90 Turkish households with 468 people.

Since the end of 1912 the village became part of Bulgaria and the Turkish families fled from the village.

== Economy ==
The light industry and the agriculture and stock farming are the most important sources of income in the village. There are clothing and textile, wood processing and furniture making, stone and marble processing and food producing workshops. Several shops for industrial goods and grocery stores are opened in the village. Many people go to work to Gotse Delchev.

== Institutions ==
The village is governed by a Mayor and as part of the Gotse Delchev Municipality by the Municipal Mayor. There is post office in Musomishta, providing all the postal services.

== Education and health-care ==
A kindergarten with a nursery "Prolet" takes care for the children from 0 to 6 years. The primary school "Hristo Botev" is teaching the pupils from 1st to 8th grade. There is a community center with a public library "Nokola Yonkov Vaptsarov". The health care is provided by a general practitioner and a dentist.

== Religion ==
The vast majority of the population are Orthodox Christians. The church in the village is named after St Nicolas of Bari. There is another small church in the end of the village "St George".
