= Kornitsa =

Kornitsa Корница
- Village
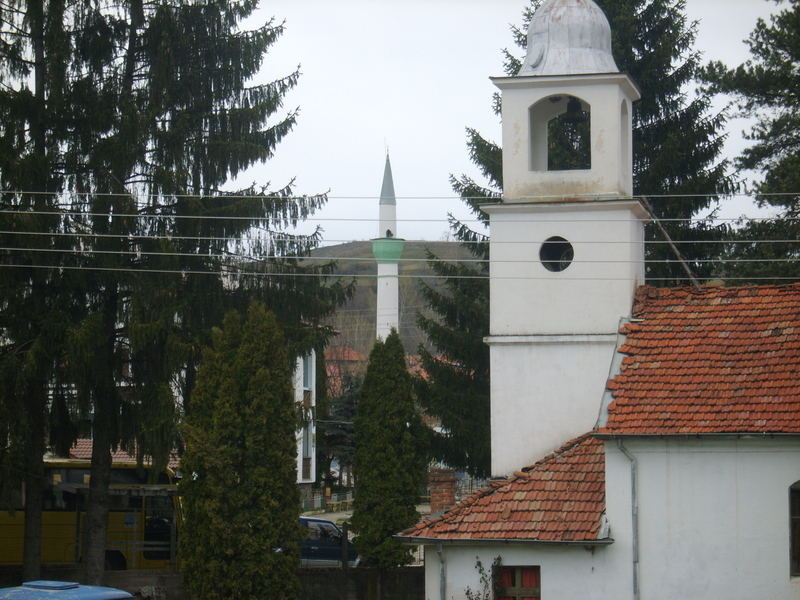

- Location within Bulgaria
- Coordinates: 41°38′N 23°41′E
- Country: Bulgaria
- Province: Blagoevgrad Province
- Municipality: Gotse Delchev

Government
  - Mayor: Ramadan Byalk (DPS)

Area
  - Total: 63.584 km^{2} (24.550 sq mi)
- Elevation: 660 m (2,170 ft)

Population (15-03-2012)
  - Total: 1,592
- GRAO
- Time zone: UTC+2 (EET)
  - Summer (DST): UTC+3 (EEST)
- Postal Code: 2970
- Area code: 07520
- Website: http://www.kornitsa.com/forum/

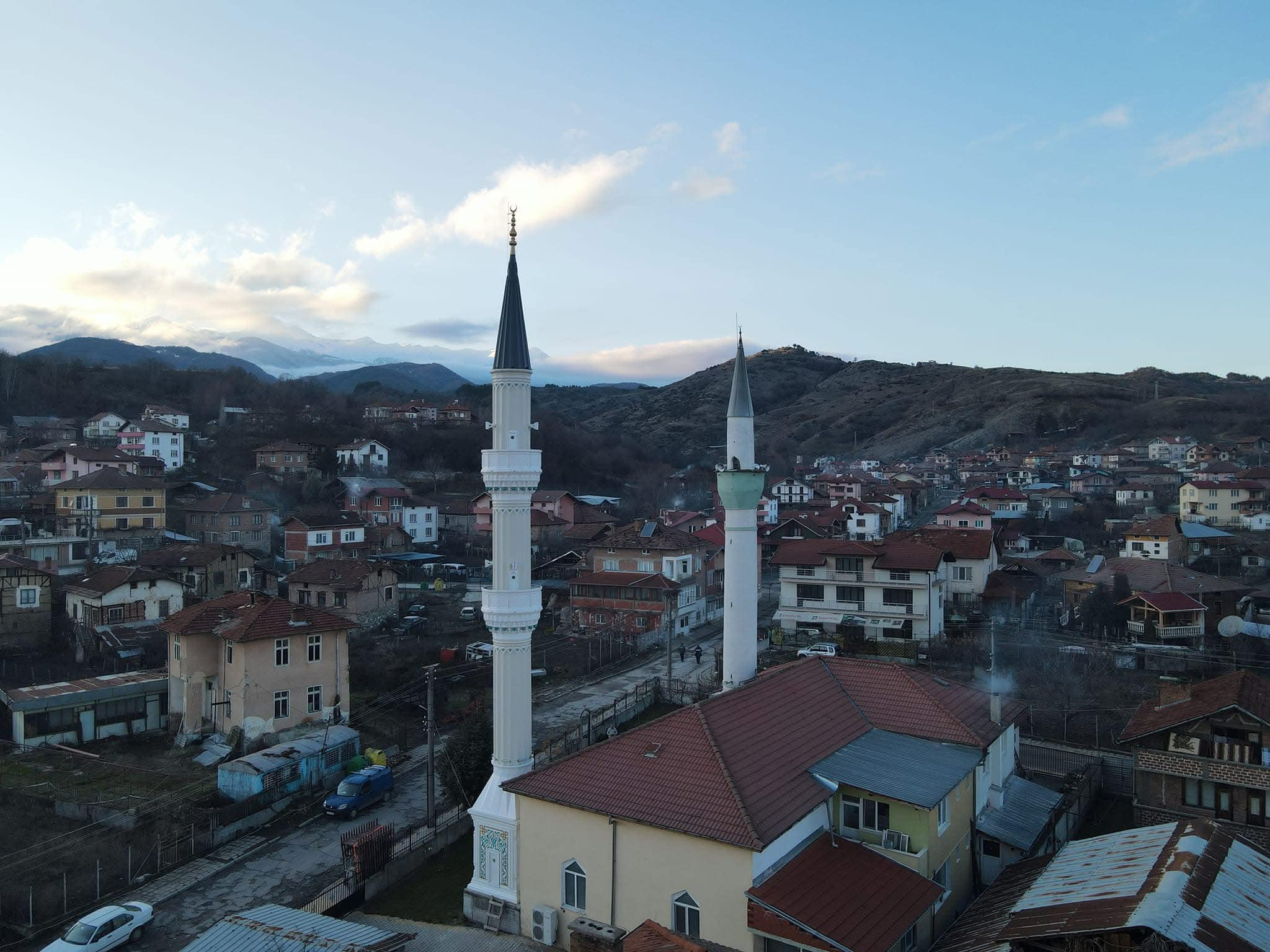
Drone view with the Mosque

Kornitsa is a village in Gotse Delchev Municipality, in Blagoevgrad Province, Bulgaria. It is situated 9 kilometers northwest of Gotse Delchev and 63 kilometers southeast of Blagoevgrad in the foothills of Pirin mountain. The river of Marevo flows through the village.

== History ==
The village is mentioned for first time in 1478 as a settlement with 99 non-Muslim households and 4 widows. In 1873 were counted 210 male inhabitants of pomak origin, living in 90 households. In 1900 year there were 680 pomak people, living in 90 households.

After the First Balkan War the village together with the whole region of Nevrokop joined Bulgaria and was subject of ethnic and religious changes due to the migration after the war. Almost all of the Greek and the majority of the Turkish population fled from the area and many Bulgarian Christian and some Bulgarian Muslim people came from the parts of Macedonia, left outside the Bulgarian border. The local population of Bulgarian Muslims however continued to present vast majority of the rural population, including the village of Kornitsa. Immediately after becoming part of Bulgaria, forces of IMRO with the assistance of the Bulgarian Orthodox Church started a process of enforced conversion of the pomak population to Christianity and changing of their Islamic names. There were 250 pomak households in Kornitsa in the end of 1912. The campaign led to no significant results after those actions, because the local people returned to their old names and religion in the recent months. There has been several other attempts of conversion- in 1917 and in 1942. After 1944 the conversion ceased for a while, but in 1956 a new strategy has been formed about the "national awareness of the Bulgarian Muslims". On March 28, 1973 in the village of Kornitsa armed forces of the Militia and the Army attempted to occupy the village and met organized resistance from the local people and there were casualties from the both sides. There is a monument in the center of the village and annually a memorial service takes place there. Many families were displaced to the Northern districts of Bulgaria - Mihaylovgrad (nowadays Montana), Vratsa, Pleven, Tolbuhin (nowadays Dobrich). Twelve people were imprisoned for different terms. The aftermath of those events seriously affected the life of the people, who left in these villages. The policy towards changing the Islamic names and diminishing the influence of the Islamic religion led to restrictions on the traditional clothing, especially of the women. On December 29, 1989 year the new Bulgarian government officially ceased the assimilation and returned the old names, so that day is praised as a holiday and named "Kortolush Bairam".

== Economy ==
After the 1989 year some people migrated to Republic of Turkey and to other countries from Western Europe mostly because of the worsening of the economic situation. The opening of the road to Greece through Gotse Delchev hardly improved the economics in the rural settlements and tobacco growing continued to present the most important source of income, together with other agricultural activities. There are not any industrial subjects in the village. Many men work abroad and send money back to their families.

== Climate and nature ==
Kornisa is situated in the foothills of the Pirin mountain. The climate is transitional-Mediterranean with mountainous influence. The winter is snowy, but short, the summer is hot and dry, the spring and the autumn are long and rainy.

The Marevo river flows through the village and gathers water from the higher parts of the mountain. There are three small cirque lake in the Kornitsa cirque - Kornitsa lakes. Places for picnic and rest have been made along the river and the village is an access point for mountain tours.

== Religion and society ==
The vast majority of the population are Bulgarian Muslims and there are few Christian families. There are a mosque and an Orthodox church in the center of the village.

== Institutions ==
The village is governed by a Mayor and as part of the Gotse Delchev Municipality by the Mayor of the municipality. There is a kindergarten named "Shtastlivo detstvo" - "Happy childhood" in translation and a Primary school "Sv. Paisiy Hilendarski", teaching the students from 1st to 8th grade. A community center with a public library "Otets Paisiy" is also a home of amateur men and women groups for authentic folklore songs. The health care is provided by a general practitioner. There is a grocery store, a cafe and a bakery for bread.
