= Bukovo =

Bukovo Буково
- Village
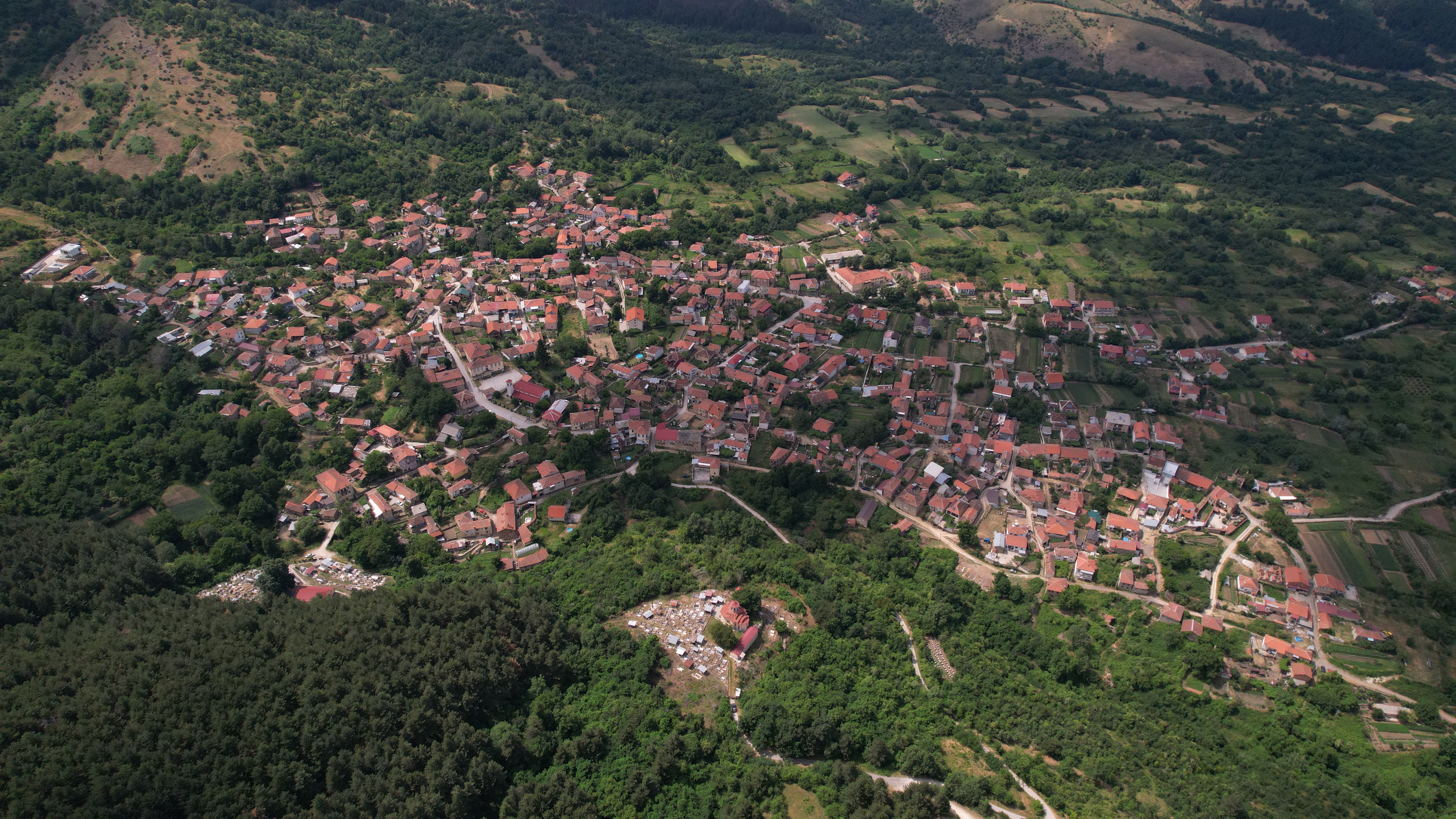
- Air view of the village

- Location within North Macedonia
- Coordinates: 40°58′59″N 21°19′59″E
- Country: North Macedonia
- Region: Pelagonia
- Municipality: Bitola
- Elevation: 821 m (2,694 ft)

Population (2002)
  - Total: 3,494
- Time zone: UTC+1 (CET)
  - Summer (DST): UTC+2 (CEST)
- Postal code: 7000
- Area code: +389 047
- Car plates: BT

Bukovo (Macedonian: Буково, pronounced [ˈbukɔvɔ]) is a village in the Bitola municipality approximately three kilometers' distance from the city of Bitola in North Macedonia.

Like most other larger villages in the country, locals typically distinguish an "upper" (горна) and "lower" (долна) quarter (маала). Historically, the latter developed from the expansion of the former. The neighborhood Bukovski Livadi (Буковски Ливади, "Bukovo Meadows") comprises ten residential streets and is located at the entrance to the village; often considered a part of Bukovo, it is actually a suburb of the City of Bitola.

The village collectively celebrates the Feast of the Transfiguration as its local holiday — referred to as "the Day" (Денот) — after the village's eponymous monastery. The celebration of Lazarus Saturday is also upheld devotedly, a tradition which has very nearly died out in the rest of the country.

The village is famous for its crushed red pepper or chilli flakes which it is credited with inventing.

== Demographics ==
19th-century geographers write that Bukovo was once a completely Orthodox Christian village with a school run by the Patriarchate of Constantinople. According to Bulgarian ethnographer Vasil Kanchov in 1900, the village of Bukovo was inhabited by 1,490 Christian Bulgarians. According to geographer Dimitri Mishev (D. M. Brancoff), the town had a total population of 2,400 people in 1905, all Patriarchist Bulgarians (sic) "Grecomans".

According to the 2002 census, the village had a total population of 3,494 people: 3,456 ethnic Macedonians, 11 Albanians, 14 Turks, 1 Aromanian, 6 Serbs and 6 declared as "other".

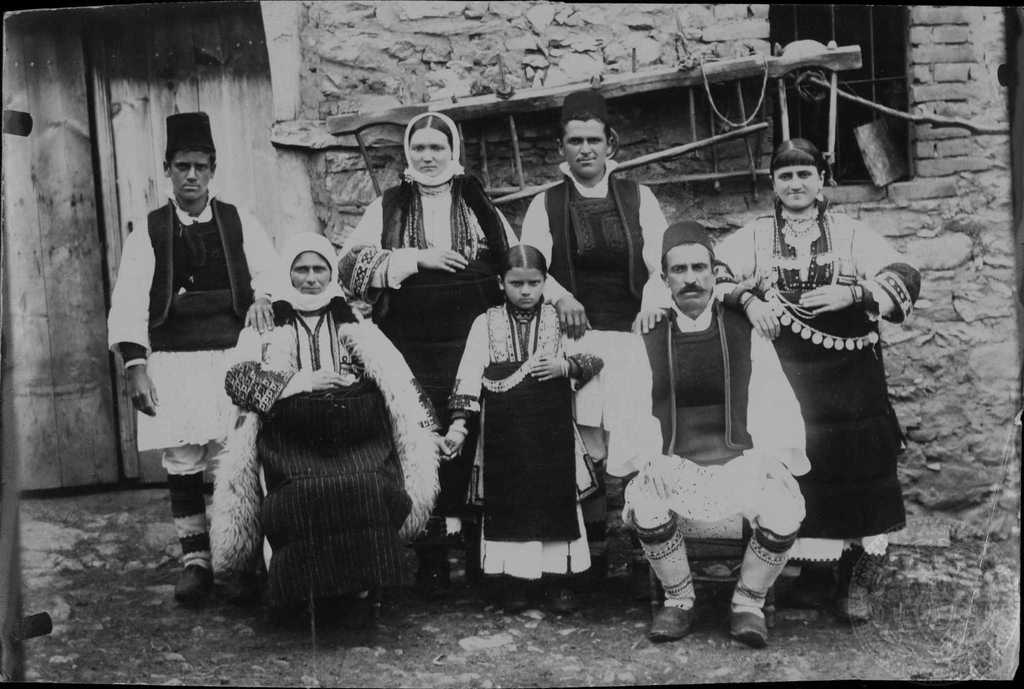
A peasant family.

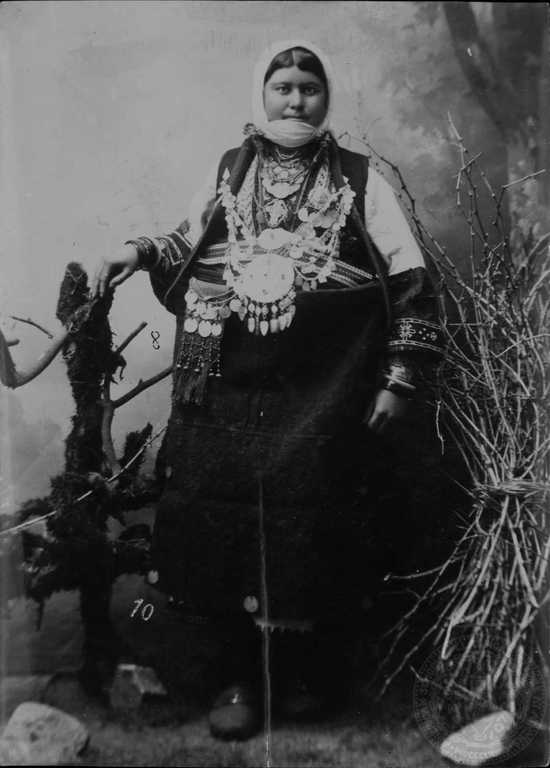
Ladies' traditional garment.
Historical photographs from Bukovo, c. beginning of the 20th century.
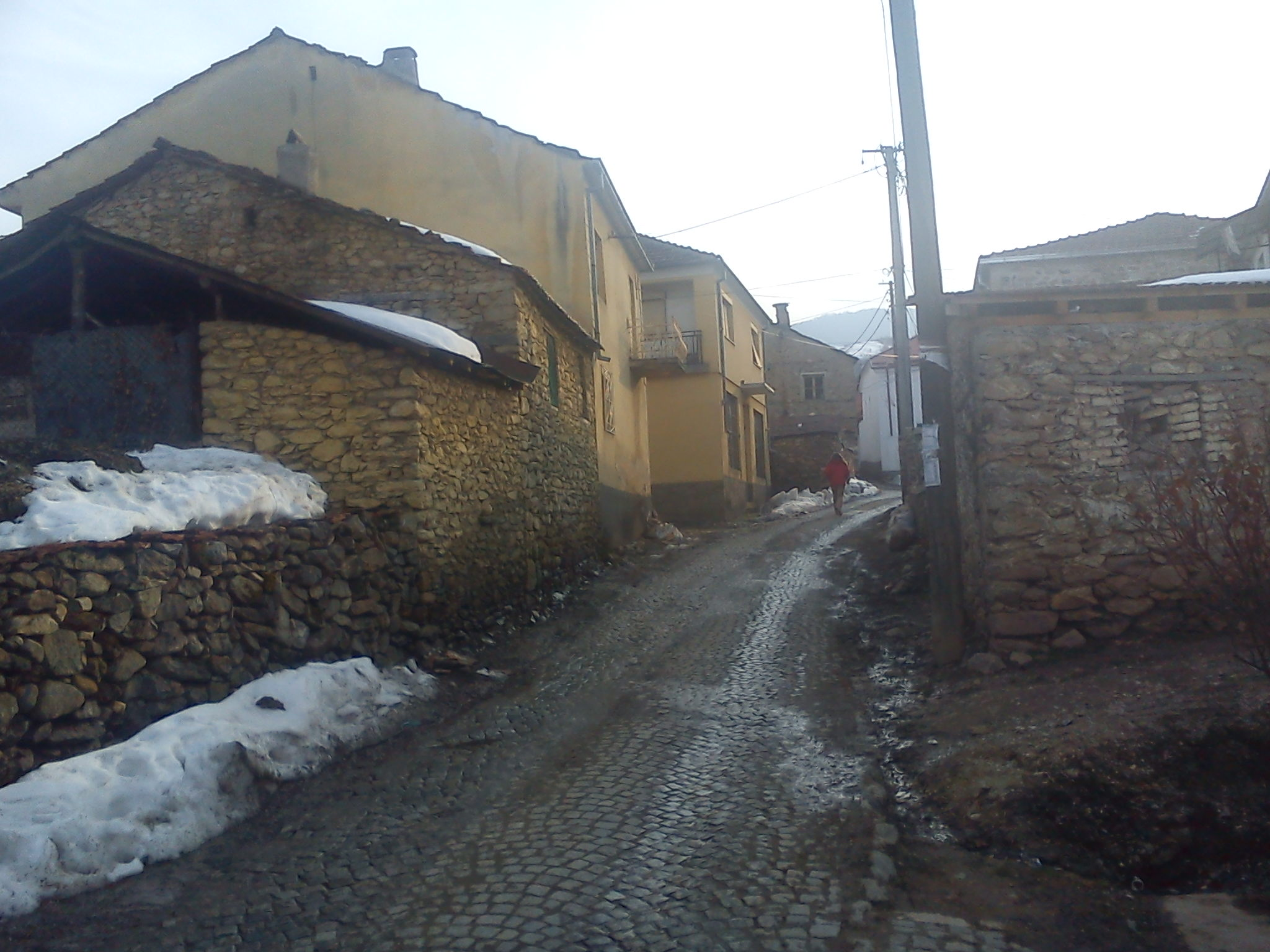
The main road in Bukovo.

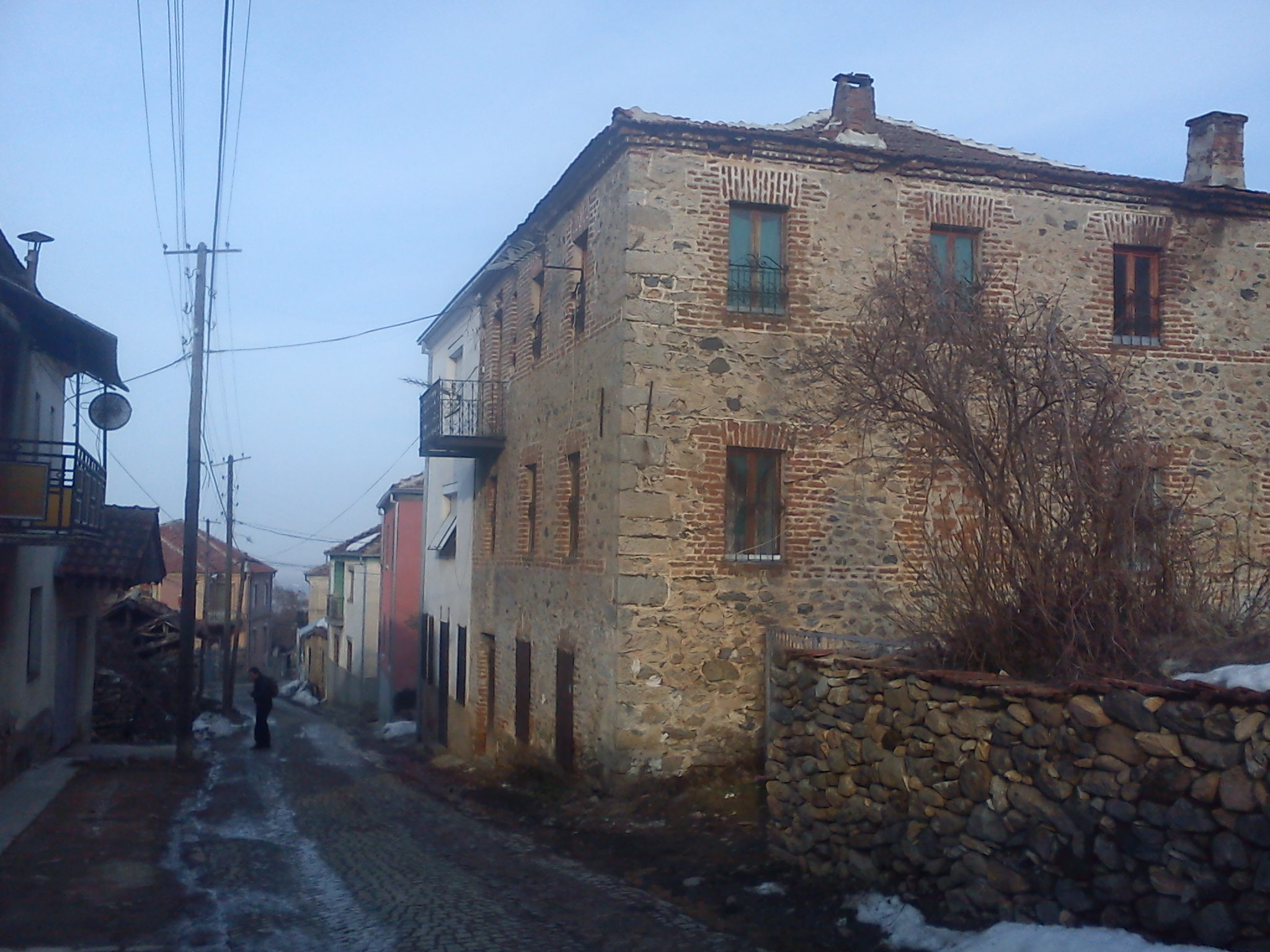
A view from the main road.

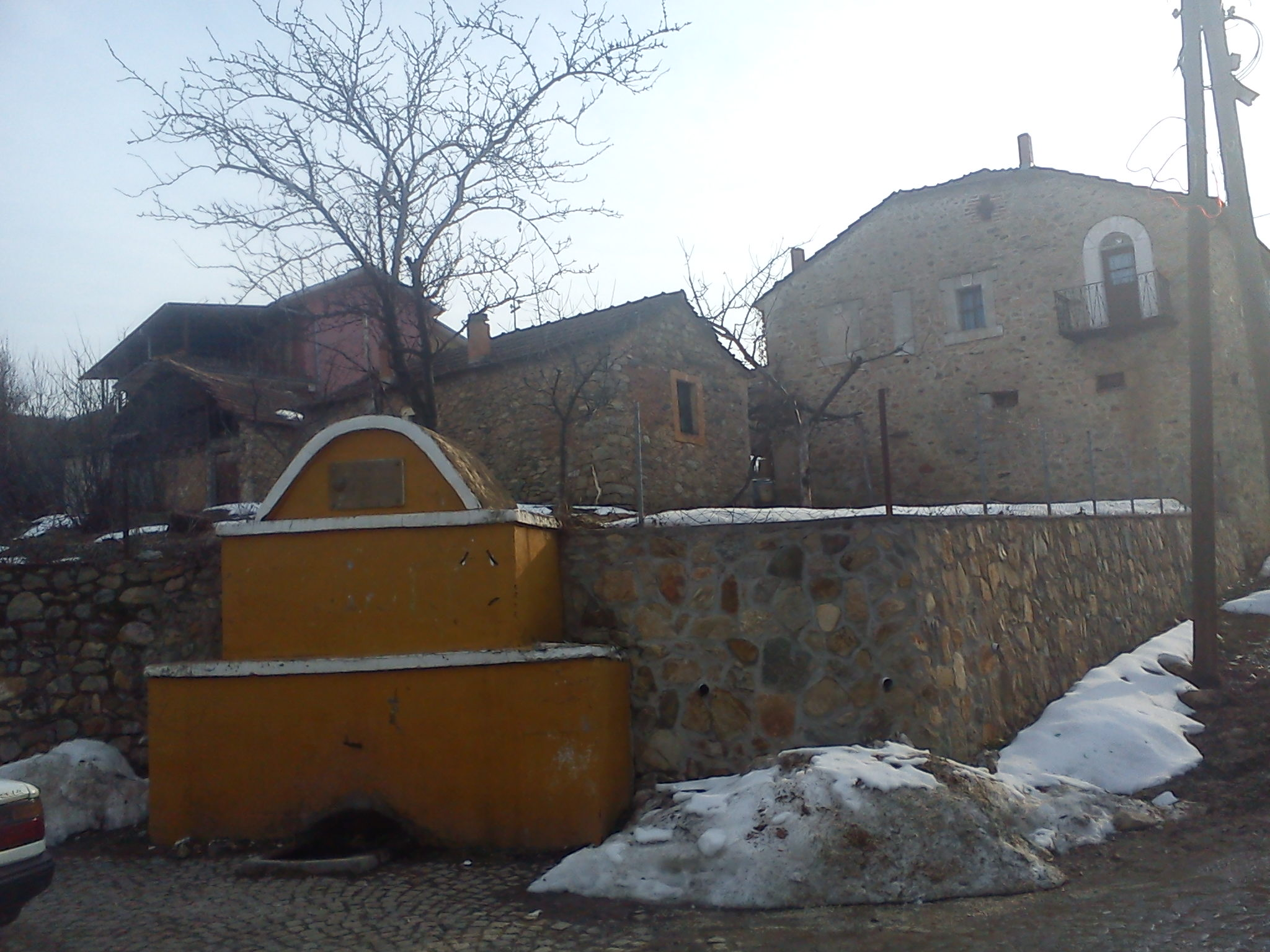
An old drinking fountain.

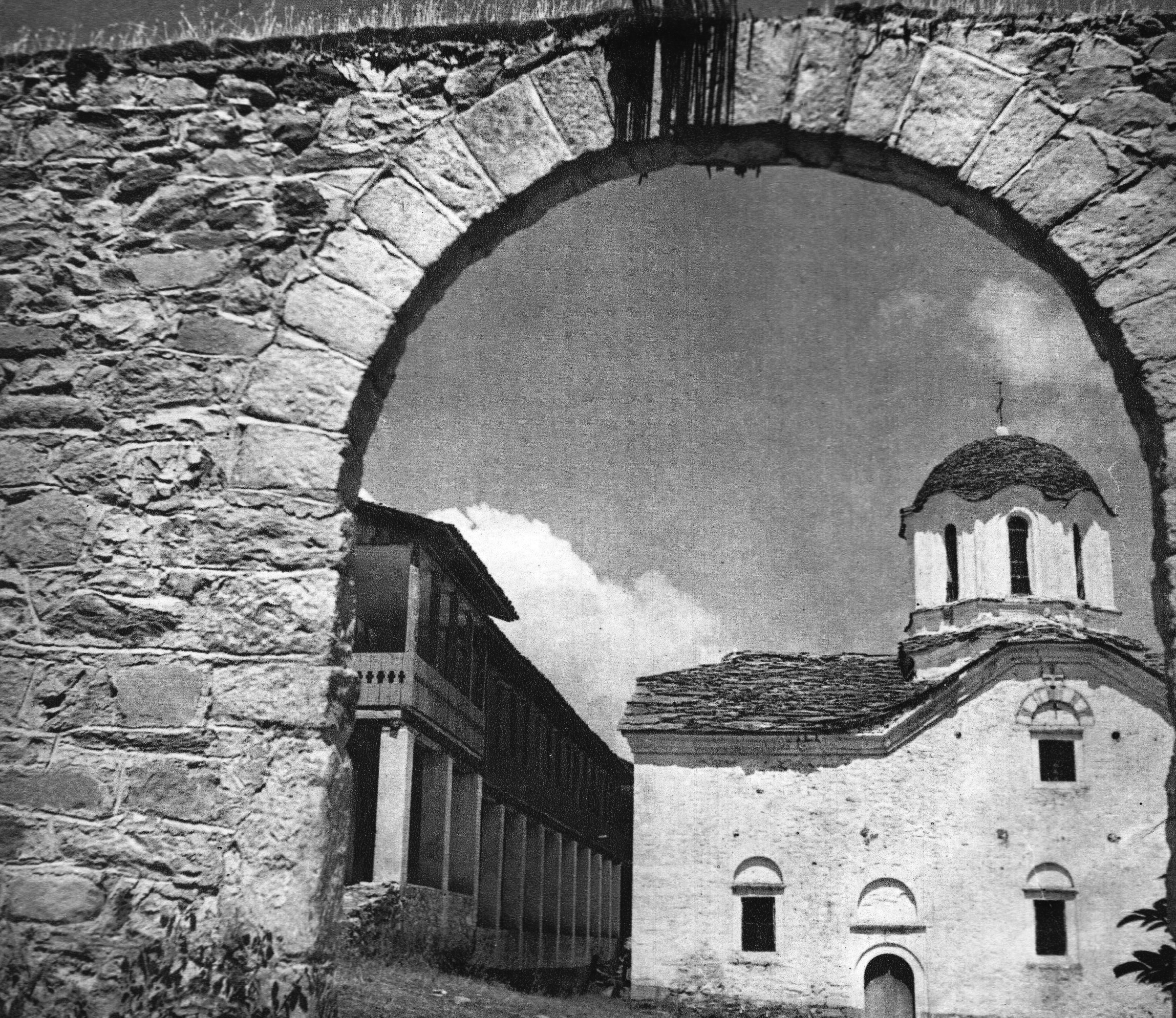
Bukovo Monastery, near Bitola, before 1950
Photographs from Bukovo, March 2012.
