= Borovo, Blagoevgrad Province =

Borovo Борово
- Village
- Location within Bulgaria
- Coordinates: 41°36′N 23°44′E
- Country: Bulgaria
- Province: Blagoevgrad Province
- Municipality: Gotse Delchev

Government
  - Mayor: Georgi Naidenov (GERB)

Area
  - Total: 10.348 km^{2} (3.995 sq mi)
- Elevation: 507 m (1,663 ft)

Population (15-12-2011)
  - Total: 1,058
- Time zone: UTC+2 (EET)
  - Summer (DST): UTC+3 (EEST)
- Postal Code: 2904
- Area code: 0751

Borovo is a village in Gotse Delchev Municipality, in Blagoevgrad Province, Bulgaria. The village is 2 kilometers (1.2 mi) north of Gotse Delchev. There are no industries in it, but the land is arable and fertile. The village has a post office. The medical care is provided by a general practitioner. The primary school "Kliment Ohridski" is responsible for the education of the children from the village. An amateur football club "Pirin-Barsa" is playing in the provincial league.
