= Krushevo, Blagoevgrad Province =

Village in Bulgaria

Krushevo Крушево
- Village
- Location within Bulgaria
- Coordinates: 41°36′N 23°53′E
- Country: Bulgaria
- Province: Blagoevgrad Province
- Municipality: Garmen

Government
  - Suffragan Mayor: Sabri Belyanski

Area
  - Total: 12,495 km^{2} (4,824 sq mi)
- Elevation: 933 m (3,061 ft)

Population (15 December 2011)
  - Total: 246
- GRAO
- Time zone: UTC+2 (EET)
  - Summer (DST): UTC+3 (EEST)
- Postal Code: 2945
- Area code: 07531

Krushevo is a compact mountainous village in Garmen Municipality, in Blagoevgrad Province, Bulgaria. It is situated in the Dabrash part of the Rhodope Mountains, 5 kilometers east of Garmen and 80 kilometers southeast of Blagoevgrad. The village is connected with the third class road from Gotse Delchev to Satovcha by a 2 kilometers of asphalt road going north from the main road and continuing to Oreshe.

Krushevo was mentioned for first time in 1660 in the Ottoman documents. In 1873 were counted 160 inhabitants of pomak origin. In the book of Vasil Kanchov, in 1900 it had a population of 340 people of pomak origin. Nowadays the village has population of about 240 people - all of them Muslim of pomak origin. Many families migrated to the bigger towns and abroad. People grow tobacco and some men are employed in the gneiss processing. A small sewing factory is employing most of the women in the village. The school in the village was closed in 2010 due to the decreasing the number of children in school age and they are transported to the school in Dolno Dryanovo 3 kilometers south. There is a kindergarten working there, but with reduced in half working hours.
