= Osikovo, Blagoevgrad Province =

Osikovo Осиково
- Village
- Location within Bulgaria
- Coordinates: 41°42′N 23°47′E
- Country: Bulgaria
- Province: Blagoevgrad Province
- Municipality: Garmen

Government
  - Mayor: Fikret Bayramov (GERB)

Area
  - Total: 57.475 km^{2} (22.191 sq mi)
- Elevation: 1,000 m (3,300 ft)

Population (15 December 2011)
  - Total: 500
- GRAO
- Time zone: UTC+2 (EET)
  - Summer (DST): UTC+3 (EEST)
- Postal Code: 2965
- Area code: 07533

Osikovo is a mountainous village in Garmen Municipality, in Blagoevgrad Province, Bulgaria. It is situated in the Dabrash part of the Rhodope Mountains, 11 kilometers north-northwest of Garmen and 66 kilometers southeast of Blagoevgrad.

The village is mentioned in old Ottoman documents from 1636 as "a village with 65 non-Muslim households". In 1900, Osikovo was described as a mixed village with 464 Bulgarian-Christian and 240 Bulgarian-Muslim people. There is an old church "St Demetrius" (Bulgarian: Свети Димитър, Sveti Dimitar), built in 1846 and an artistic monument of culture of local significance.

Nowadays, Osikovo is a pomak village with no industrial subjects. People grow tobacco or go to work in other settlements or abroad. The village lies on the asphalt road between Ognyanovo, Blagoevgrad Province and Ribnovo after the village of Skrebatno, 15 kilometers from Ognyanovo. There are no health care or educational institutions in the village.

Osikovo Ridge on Graham Land, Antarctica is named after the village.
