= Gorno Dryanovo =

Gorno Dryanovo Горно Дряново
- Village
- Location within Bulgaria
- Coordinates: 41°39′N 23°50′E
- Country: Bulgaria
- Province: Blagoevgrad Province
- Municipality: Garmen

Government
  - Mayor: Ibrahim Pingov (local coalition)

Area
  - Total: 11,107 km^{2} (4,288 sq mi)
- Elevation: 1,225 m (4,019 ft)

Population (15 December 2011)
  - Total: 1,042
- GRAO
- Time zone: UTC+2 (EET)
  - Summer (DST): UTC+3 (EEST)
- Postal Code: 2963
- Area code: 07527

Gorno Dryanovo is a mountainous village in Garmen Municipality, in Blagoevgrad Province, Bulgaria. It is situated in the Dabrash part of the Rhodope Mountains 6 kilometers northeast of Garmen and 73 kilometers southeast of Blagoevgrad on the road to between Leshten and Kovachevitsa.

The village was mentioned in the Ottoman documents in 1660. In the 19th century the village has been noted as Muslim. Ruins from an ancient fortress has been found 3 kilometers north of the village right of the road to Kovachevitsa. Only some remains of the wall on the southern and eastern side has been preserved. The fortress has been used in the Thracian and Roman times.

Nowadays the village is inhabited by people of pomak origin, who are predominantly Muslim. There are no industrial subjects in the village. People grow tobacco and potatoes. Many men work as builders in the neighboring villages and abroad. There is a primary school "St Paisii Hiledarski", a kindergarten (a branch of the kindergarten in Ognyanovo) and a community center with a public library. The health care is provided by two doctors – a general practitioner and a dentist.
