= Debren =

Debren Дебрен
- Village
- Location within Bulgaria
- Coordinates: 41°34′54″N 23°49′22″E
- Country: Bulgaria
- Province: Blagoevgrad Province
- Municipality: Garmen

Government
  - Mayor: Tyurkian Hodjova (BSP)

Area
  - Total: 18,023 km^{2} (6,959 sq mi)
- Elevation: 883 m (2,897 ft)

Population (15 December 2011)
  - Total: 2,290
- GRAO
- Time zone: UTC+2 (EET)
  - Summer (DST): UTC+3 (EEST)
- Postal Code: 2961
- Area code: 07523
- Website: https://web.archive.org/web/20120315164420/http://debren.selo.bg/ In Bulgarian

Debren is a village in Garmen Municipality, in Blagoevgrad Province, Bulgaria. It is situated in the Dabrash part of the Rhodope Mountains 2.5 kilometers southeast of Garmen and 110 kilometers southeast of Blagoevgrad.

== History ==
The village has a very long history. There are two stone-made Roman bridges in the old village, that existed until 1968 year, when the whole village was moved from its previous mountainous location to a new one - lower and closer to the Mesta river, where the land is arable.

The old village is now almost deserted, but there still is an old church and an old mosque, both still in relatively good condition. There are also some inhabited houses, but most of the buildings are in ruins. The village was mentioned first by the modern name in 1660 in Ottoman documents. In the 19th century the village was described as a Muslim village inhabited with people of Pomak origin.

The new village was built with central water supply and sewerage and straight streets with two story houses.

== Economy and transportation ==
The village is connected with Garmen by a third class asphalt road, that connects Garmen with Hadzhidimovo and Satovcha. The road, connecting the old and the new village is unpaved. The village has bus connections with Garmen, Gotse Delchev, Blagoevgrad, Sofia, Satovcha and Hadzhidimovo. The agriculture is the most important source of income, especially tobacco growing. There aren't any industrial subjects in the village.

== Education and health care ==
There is a primary school "St Kliment Ohridski". Its new building was opened in 2004 year. There is a kindergarten "Nikola Vaptsarov" and a community center "Paisii Hilendarski" with a public library and local folklore dancing formations for men and women. A medical doctor and a dentist provide health care in Debren. The nearest hospital is in Gotse Delchev.
