= Nikola Atanasov =

Bulgarian politician and revolutionary

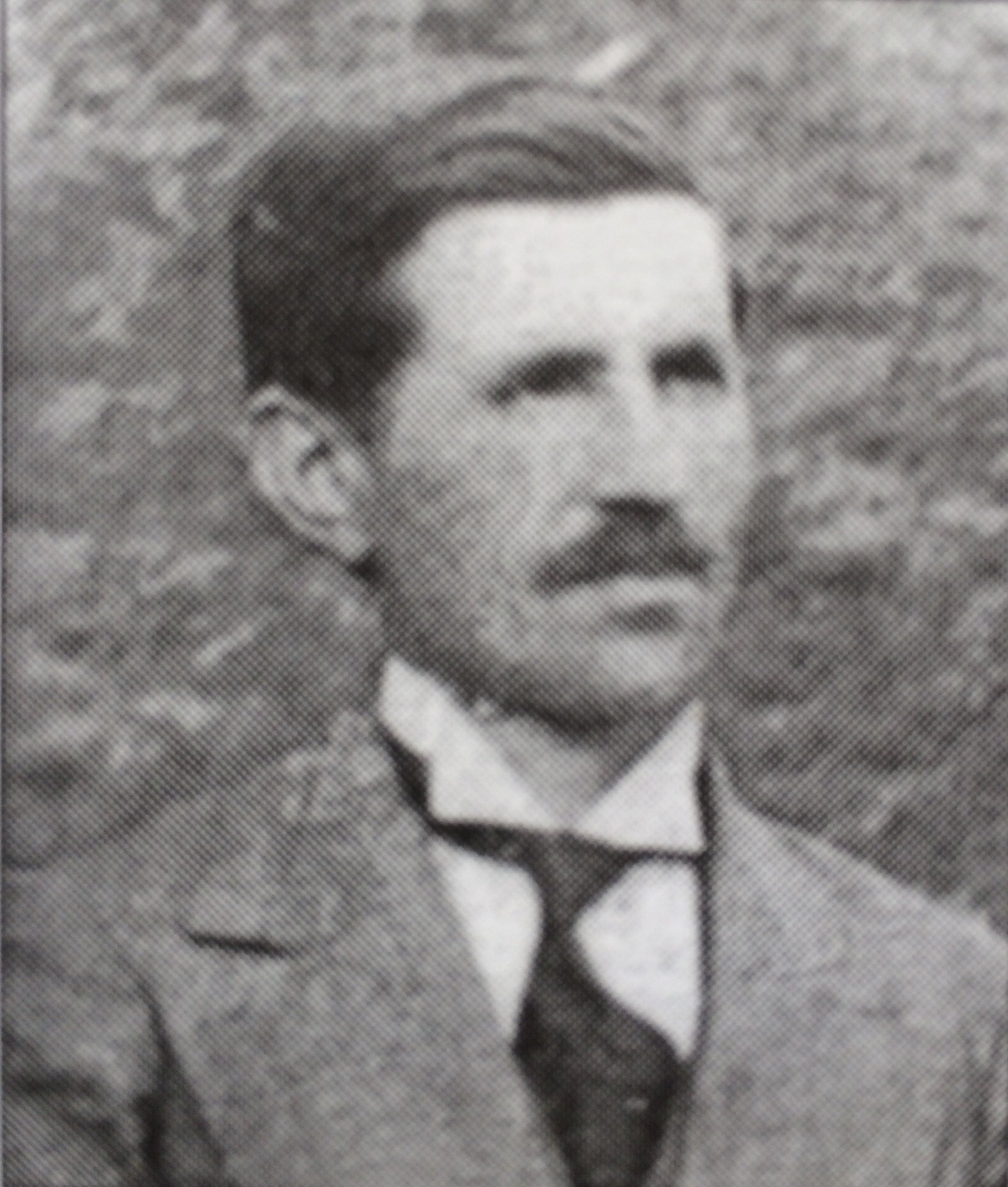
- Nikola Atanasov
- Born: 1886; Fotovishta, today Bulgaria
- Died: March 15, 1945 (aged 58–59); Nevrokop, Bulgaria
- Organization: IMARO

Nikola Atanasov (Bulgarian: Никола Атанасов) was a Bulgarian revolutionary and a politician from the eastern part of Macedonia.

== Biography ==
Nikola Atanasov was born to a poor family in the village of Fotovishta, today known as Ognyanovo in Garmen Municipality, then part of the Ottoman Empire. He won a scholarship and finished the Bulgarian Theological School in Constantinople. He returned in Macedonia and entered the Internal Macedonian-Adrianople Revolutionary Organization (IMARO) by joining the revolutionary bands of Stoyan Filipov and Stoyan Malchankov.

After the liberation of Pirin Macedonia in the Balkan Wars in 1912, Atanasov worked in the tax administration of Nevrokop, today known as Gotse Delchev. At the same time, he continued to participate in the activities of the revolutionary organization.

In April 1926, Atanasov was elected mayor of Nevrokop and remained in this position until May 1932. As mayor, he planned the public organization of the town – he created the first urbanization plan, he constructed a water-conduit and an electricity grid, he built a new secondary school. In his memoirs, Ivan Mihaylov wrote the following about Atanasov:

As a mayor of Nevrokop, he showed marvellous courage. He abandoned the old Turkish small town in order to implement his modern urbanization plan. Today, Nevrokop has a sewage system, a water-conduit, electrical lighting, a wonderful city park, beautiful streets, modern private and public buildings, a metropolitan's palace, a city hall, a municipal pharmacy, a hospital, a public health station, a veterinary hospital, a secondary school, a big library community centre with a theatrical hall, a modern slaughterhouse... all of this was achieved by Nikola Atanasov according to his plan, and at a time, when a large mass of refugees, that fled from the occupied parts of Macedonia, had to be accommodated.

After the Bulgarian coup d'état of 1934, and the strike against the IMARO, Atanasov was interned in Lovech. After the Bulgarian coup d'état of 1944, Atanasov hid in the village of Zagrade. Surrounded by the militia, Atanasov showed resistance and was severely wounded in his backbone. Although he was in a stretcher, he was prosecuted by the so-called People's Court, a temporary Bulgarian judiciary institution, which was active in the period between December 19, 1944 and April 1945. He was killed with pick-mattocks in the garden of the Nevrokop prison.
