= Hvostyane =

Hvostyane Хвостяне
- Village
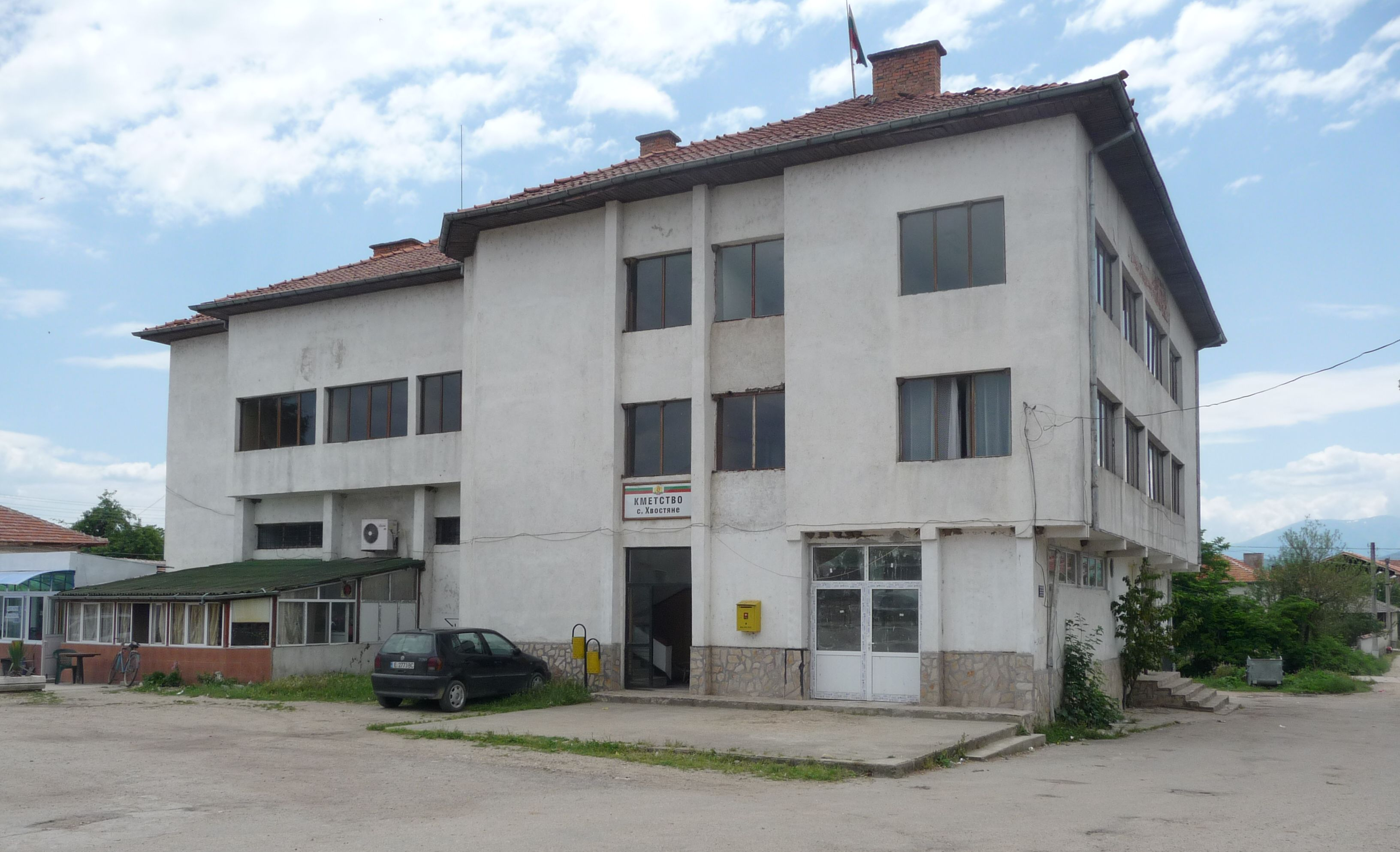

- Location within Bulgaria
- Coordinates: 41°33′N 23°51′E
- Country: Bulgaria
- Province: Blagoevgrad Province
- Municipality: Garmen

Government
  - Mayor: Seihan Ahmedov (GERB)

Area
  - Total: 7.68 km^{2} (2.97 sq mi)
- Elevation: 506 m (1,660 ft)

Population (15 December 2011)
  - Total: 570
- GRAO
- Time zone: UTC+2 (EET)
  - Summer (DST): UTC+3 (EEST)
- Postal Code: 2942
- Area code: 07522

Hvostyane is a compact village in Garmen Municipality, in Blagoevgrad Province, Bulgaria. It is situated in the valley of Mesta river 6 kilometers southeast of Garmen and 81 kilometers southeast of Blagoevgrad and is the southernmost village of the municipality.

There are no industrial subjects in the village. People grow tobacco, potatoes and strawberries. The majority of the people are Muslim of Turks. There is a primary school "Dimitar Talev", but the number of the students is decreasing and a kindergarten, branch of the kindergarten in Dabnitsa.

The village is situated on the road, connecting both Garmen and Gotse Delchev (town) with Hadzhidimovo.
