= Oreshe =

Oreshe Ореше
- Village
- Location within Bulgaria
- Coordinates: 41°37′N 23°53′E
- Country: Bulgaria
- Province: Blagoevgrad Province
- Municipality: Garmen

Government
  - Suffragan Mayor: Rakip Kamburov

Area
  - Total: 14.556 km^{2} (5.620 sq mi)
- Elevation: 1,116 m (3,661 ft)

Population (15 December 2011)
  - Total: 255
- GRAO
- Time zone: UTC+2 (EET)
  - Summer (DST): UTC+3 (EEST)
- Postal Code: 2943
- Area code: 07531

Oreshe is a mountainous village in Garmen Municipality, in Blagoevgrad Province, Bulgaria. It is situated in the Dabrash part of the Rhodope Mountains, 7 kilometers northeast of Garmen and 79 kilometers southeast of Blagoevgrad.

The village is connected by a 7 kilometer paved mountainous road to Dolno Dryanovo and thus with the third class road between Gotse Delchev and Satovcha. There aren't industrial subjects in the village. Growing tobacco and potatoes and sheep and goat farming are the main sources of income for the people. Many go to work in other settlements or abroad.

The village was mentioned for first time in the Ottoman documents in 1660 year as village with 25 non-Muslim households. At the end of the 19th century there were 104 male inhabitants in 30 households – all of them Muslim Pomaks.

There are no health care or educational institutions in Oreshe. An amateur football club "Varbica" plays in the regional league.
