= Marchevo, Blagoevgrad Province =

Marchevo Марчево
- Village
- Location within Bulgaria
- Coordinates: 41°36′N 23°48′E
- Country: Bulgaria
- Province: Blagoevgrad Province
- Municipality: Garmen

Government
  - Sufragan Mayor: Rosen Marchev

Area
  - Total: 5.92 km^{2} (2.29 sq mi)
- Elevation: 560 m (1,840 ft)

Population (15 December 2011)
  - Total: 172
- GRAO
- Time zone: UTC+2 (EET)
  - Summer (DST): UTC+3 (EEST)
- Postal Code: 2949
- Area code: 07523

Marchevo is a small village in Garmen Municipality, in Blagoevgrad Province, Bulgaria. The village is situated between Garmen and Ognyanovo and the tree villages are almost merged. There is a significant Romani minority, living in the eastern part of the village. The church "Nativity of Virgin Mary" (Bulgarian: Рождество Богородично, Rozhdestvo Bogorodichno) was built in 1908 over the foundations of an older church. The school in the village was closed in 2002. There isn't also a kindergarten. There is a hotel and guest-houses.
