= Ribnovo =

Ribnovo Рибново
- Village
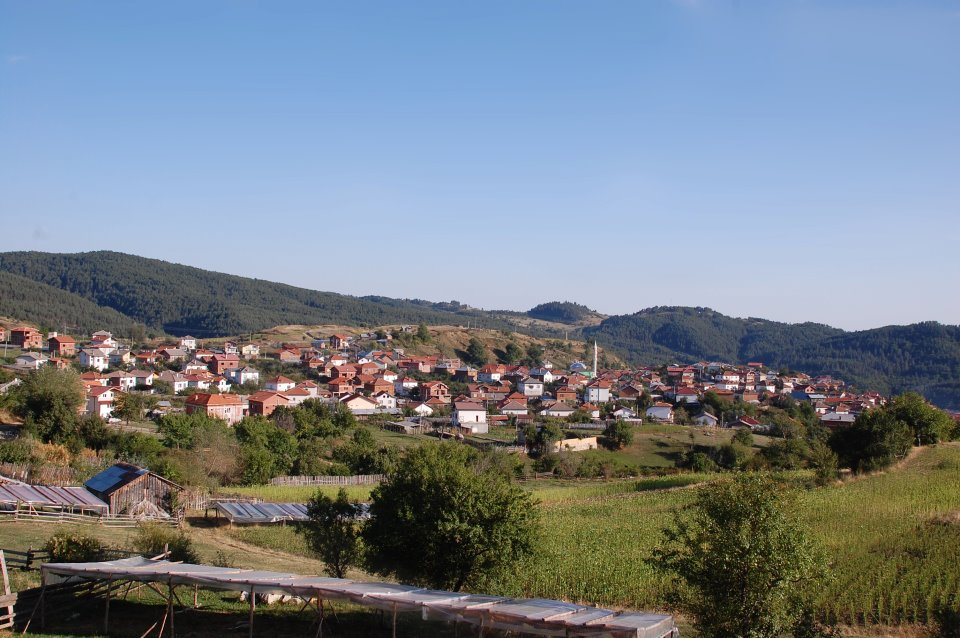

- Location within Bulgaria
- Coordinates: 41°43′N 23°46′E
- Country: Bulgaria
- Province: Blagoevgrad Province
- Municipality: Garmen

Government
  - Mayor: Mustafa Issa (DPS)

Area
  - Total: 30.086 km^{2} (11.616 sq mi)

Population (15 December 2011)
  - Total: 2,446
- GRAO
- Time zone: UTC+2 (EET)
  - Summer (DST): UTC+3 (EEST)
- Postal Code: 2967
- Area code: 07526
- Website: http://www.ribnovo.com/

Ribnovo is an isolated mountainous village in Garmen Municipality, in Blagoevgrad Province, Bulgaria. It is situated in the Dabrash part of the Rhodope Mountains at 1152 meters altitude, 14 kilometers north-northwest from Garmen and 64 kilometers southeast of Blagoevgrad by air. The village can be reached by a 20 kilometers asphalt mountainous road from Ognyanovo through the villages Skrebatno and Osikovo.

== History ==
Ribnovo has long history. Remains of an ancient necropolis have been unearthed near the village. In the Ottoman documents from 1478 year the village is described as "settlement with 81 non-Muslim households". In 1900 year Vasil Kanchov described the village as one inhabited with 560 Bulgarian-Muslim people, living in 105 households. Nowadays the village still grows and people build new houses.

== Economy ==
There aren't any industrial subjects in this big village and the arable land is limited. Many people go to work in other settlements in the summer or abroad.

== Religion ==
In Ribnovo people are Muslim and there are two mosques.

== Education and health care ==
In the high school "Yordan Yovkov" study more than 500 students. There is a kindergarten and a community center with a public library. There are two medical specialists, who provide health care - a general practitioner and a dentist. There is an amateur football club "Rodopa", playing in the regional league.

== Culture ==
The wedding customs are unique to the village. It has been preserved from the old Bulgarian customs and it has been influenced by the Islamic traditions. The wedding season is during autumn and winter. The festivities last for 5 days which includes a lot of singing and dancing in the center of the village. On the second day the bride's face is painted white with sequins.

|LiveWebCam http://ribnovo.com

|website = https://www.ribnovo.net/
