= Asim Ademov =

Bulgarian politician

Asim Ademov MEP
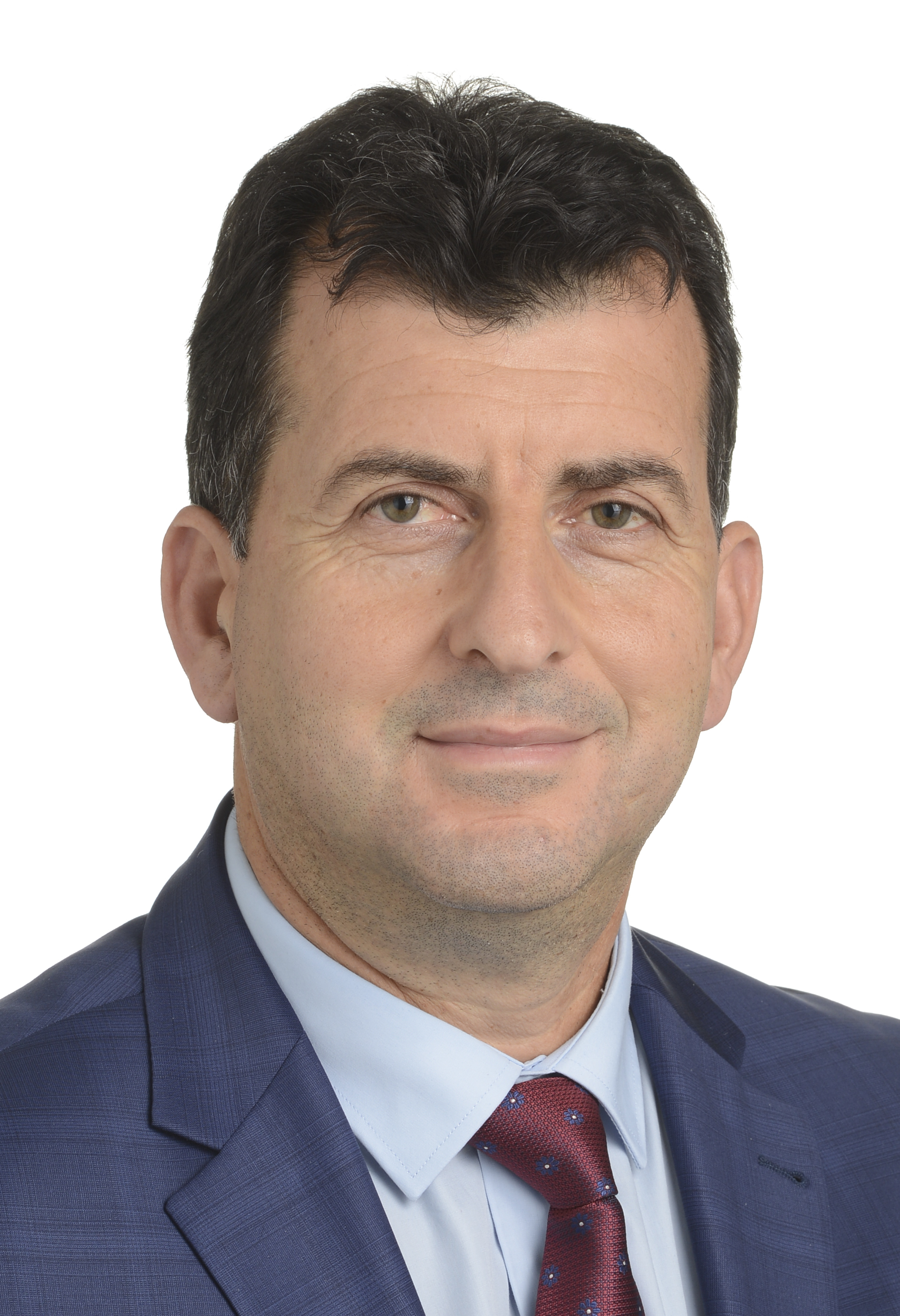

Member of the European Parliament for Bulgaria
- In office 14 September 2017 – 15 July 2024

Personal details
- Born: 3 December 1968 (age 57) Dabnitsa, Bulgaria
- Party: GERB

Asim Ahmed Ademov (Bulgarian: Асим Ахмед Адемов, born 3 December 1968) is a Bulgarian politician who has served as a Member of the European Parliament since 2017. He was re-elected in 2019. In parliament, he has served on the Committee on Civil Liberties, Justice and Home Affairs (2017-2019) and on the Committee on Culture and Education since 2019.
