= Baldevo =

Baldevo Балдево
- Village
- Location within Bulgaria
- Coordinates: 41°38′N 23°46′E
- Country: Bulgaria
- Province: Blagoevgrad Province
- Municipality: Garmen

Government
  - Suffragan Mayor: Iliana Gyurneva
- Elevation: 598 m (1,962 ft)

Population (15 December 2011)
  - Total: 192
- GRAO
- Time zone: UTC+2 (EET)
  - Summer (DST): UTC+3 (EEST)
- Postal Code: 2948
- Area code: 07523
- Website: https://web.archive.org/web/20120315162753/http://baldevo.selo.bg/ in Bulgarian

Baldevo is a village in Garmen Municipality, in Blagoevgrad Province, Bulgaria. It is situated in the western Rhodope Mountains in the valley of the Mesta river 5.5 kilometers northwest of Garmen and 70 kilometers southeast of Blagoevgrad.

The village has been inhabited by the Thracian people and remains of their presence have been found near the village. The church "St Dimitar (Demetrios)" was built in 1882. In April 1903 58 militants and many local people have died in a battle against Ottoman troops and the village was burnt down.

Nowadays Baldevo is a small village. There is a closed lignite coal mine "Kanina" in the village. Tobacco and vine growing are the most important sources of income for the people. There is no school or local health care workers in the village.
