= Garmen Municipality =

Garmen Municipality Община Гърмен
- Municipality (Obshtina)
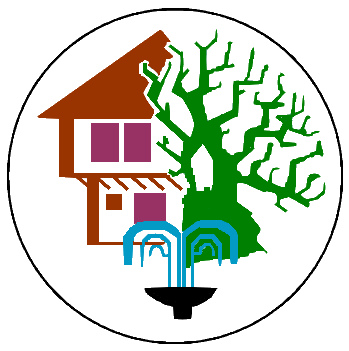
- Coat of arms

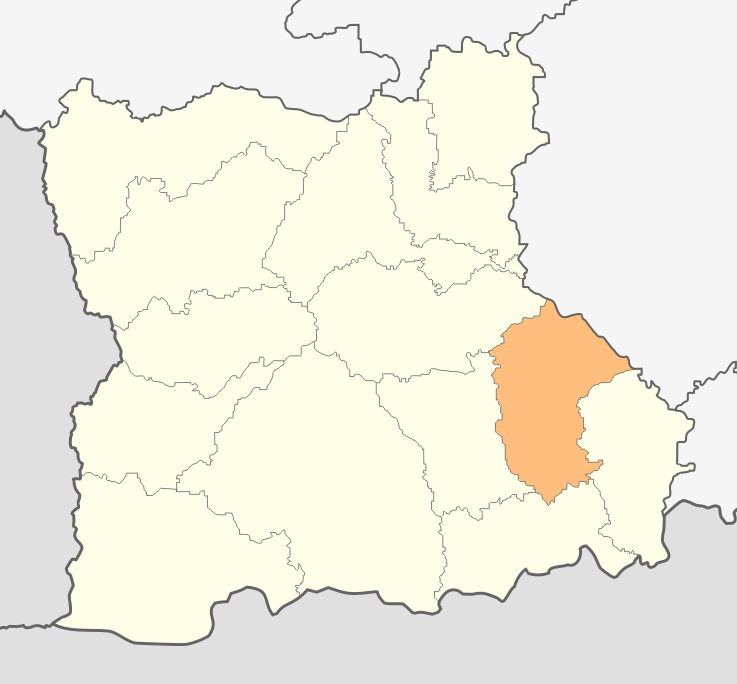
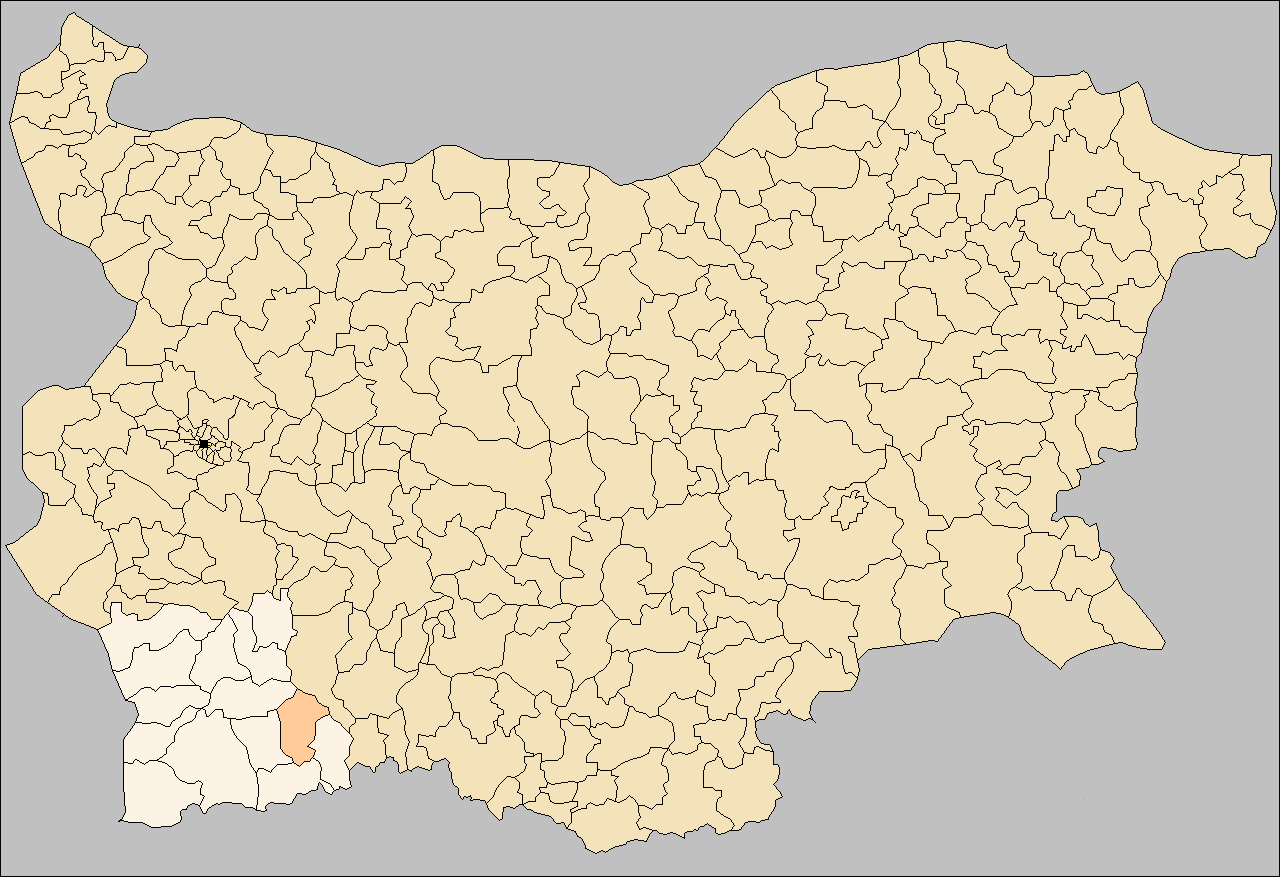
- Location in Blagoevgrad province Location on map of Bulgaria
- Coordinates: 41°36′N 23°49′E
- Country: Bulgaria
- Province (Oblast): Blagoevgrad
- Seat: Garmen

Government
  - Mayor: Feim Issa (DPS)

Area
  - Total: 388.48 km^{2} (149.99 sq mi)
- Elevation: 605 m (1,985 ft)

Population (2011)
  - Total: 14,981
  - Density: 38.56/km^{2} (99.9/sq mi)
- Time zone: UTC+2 (EET)
  - Summer (DST): UTC+3 (EEST)
- Website: www.garmen.bg

Garmen Municipality (Bulgarian: Община Гърмен) is situated in the southeastern part of Blagoevgrad Province in Southwestern Bulgaria. It is a rural municipality, composed of 16 villages. The administrative center is the village of Garmen, but the most populated village is Ribnovo. The municipality lies in the western part of the Rhodope Mountains.

== History ==
The municipality of Garmen has been a home to many tribes throughout the years, but most important have been the Thracians, Slavs and Protobulgarians. The Thracian tribe of Bessi was the main tribe that settled in the region and there are a large number of remains left in the area, proof of their rich life here. The villages of Blatska, Debren, Dabnitsa and Hvostyane have found fragments of Attic vessels and there are mound necropolises.

In about 146 AD, after long battles between Roman troops and Thracians, the area around Gotse Delchev fell to Roman rule. In 106 the emperor Trajan built the city Nicopolis ad Nestum in honor of the defeat. This town was destroyed at the end of the 6th century by the Slavs and the tribe of the Smolyani settled here. The Slavs were farmers and herdsmen. They grew millet, wheat, flax, hemp and leguminous plants and they also bred birds, cattle, sheep and goats.

Garmen is mentioned several times in the Ottoman registers during the Ottoman rule and they also built a Turkish grange in the area where Nicopolis ad Nestum was located. Until the 19th century the municipality was mainly a farming area and a few men worked as builders in the interior of the country and in the Aegean region. The first schools and churches were built in the area during the Bulgarian renaissance. Garmen's church was named after St. George. There are built the Assumption church in Ognyanovo, St. Nicholas in Kovachevitsa, St. Paraskeva in Leshten, St. Paraskeva in Skrebatno and St. Dimitar in Osikovo.

During the Russo-Turkish war (1877–1878) and during the Balkan wars (1912–1913) the population in the municipality joined volunteer troops to fight. In 1901 a volunteer "militia" was formed by Stoyko Pashkulev. The area was liberated from the Ottoman rule in 1912.

== Geography ==
Most of the municipality is mountainous and forested. There are coal deposits near Baldevo and hot springs near Ognyanovo.

Surrounding municipalities are:

- Bansko Municipality
- Gotse Delchev Municipality
- Hadzhidimovo Municipality
- Satovcha Municipality
- Velingrad Municipality

The following villages are located in Garmen Municipality:

- Garmen (Гърмен)
- Baldevo (Балдево)
- Dabnitsa (Дъбница)
- Debren (Дебрен)
- Dolno Dryanovo (Долно Дряново)
- Gorno Dryanovo (Горно Дряново)
- Hvostyane (Хвостяне)
- Kovachevitsa (Ковачевица)
- Krushevo (Крушево)
- Leshten (Лещен)
- Marchevo (Марчево)
- Ognyanovo (Огняново)
- Oreshe (Ореше)
- Osikovo (Осиково)
- Ribnovo (Рибново)
- Skrebatno (Скребатно)

The total population of the municipality is about 16,380 (21 July 2005 census). The village of Ribnovo is the largest with 2,601 inhabitants while the village of Leshten has the fewest people with only nine inhabitants. The village of Garmen has about 1,810 inhabitants.

The Garmen Municipality has 388,479 decares of land, with 70% of that being forests. The highest point in the Municipality is 1,938 meter at Mount Beslet. There are also deep river valleys in the middle and southern part of the municipality.

== Climate ==
The municipality has a Mediterranean climate tempered by the high altitude. It has one of the warmest climates in the country because it is between two climate zones-temperate continental and transitional Mediterranean. Annual precipitation is typically between 620 and 780 mm/m^{2}, distributed relatively evenly between all four seasons. The air humidity ranges from 60% to 75% throughout the year. Snow cover is usually only for 70–100 days per year.

== Infrastructure ==
Two roads of third class: Gospodintsi – Blatska and Gotse Delchev – Satovcha go through the municipality. The other roads are municipal roads of fourth class and all of them are with asphalt surface, but need repair. All the villages in the municipality are supplied with water, electricity and the bigger ones have digital phone lines and Internet. All the villages are covered with cellular phones. Every village has a post office. In the summer most of the villages are with insufficient water resources.

== Demography ==
As of 31 December 2018, the municipality of Garmen has a total population of 14,793 people.

	Population	Live births	Deaths	Natural growth	Birth rate (‰)	Death rate (‰)	Natural growth rate (‰)
2000	14,620	203	128	75	13.9	8.8	5.1
2001	14,851	186	147	39	12.5	9.9	2.5
2002	14,709	176	134	42	120	9.1	2.9
2003	14,705	187	138	49	12.7	9.4	3.3
2004	14,670	186	116	70	12.7	7.9	4.8
2005	14,593	157	149	8	10.8	10.2	0.5
2006	14,464	194	151	43	13.4	10.4	3.0
2007	14,488	216	162	54	14.9	11.2	3.7
2008	14,477	207	165	42	14.3	11.4	2.9
2009	14,504	220	151	69	15.2	10.4	4.8
2010	14,468	219	140	79	15.1	9.7	5.5
2011	14,908	159	152	7	10.7	10.2	0.5
2012	14,904	181	146	35	12.1	9.8	2.3
2013	14,863	183	129	54	12.3	8.7	3.6
2014	14,846	168	139	29	11.3	9.4	2.0
2015	14,936	181	140	41	12.1	9.4	2.7
2016	14,847	185	167	18	12.5	11.2	1.2
2017	14,861	143	135	8	9.6	9.1	0.5
2018	14,793	157	151	6	10.6	10.2	0.4

Most inhabitants are ethnic Bulgarians (65% of self-declared people), followed by ethnic Turks (around 16% of self-declared people) and Roma people (around 12% of self-declared people).

=== Religion ===
According to the latest Bulgarian census of 2011, the religious composition, among those who answered the optional question on religious identification, was the following:

.

Religious composition of Garmen Municipality
Orthodox Christianity	22.9%
Catholicism	0.3%
Protestantism	0.0%
Islam	73.3%
No religion	0.9%
Prefer not to answer, others and indefinable	2.6%

== Transportation and industry ==
The villages of the municipality are serviced by four local operators and from Gotse Delchev. There is no railway transport in the municipality. There are no major industrial subjects in the municipality. The tobacco is the most important source of income for the population. Sheep and goat farming are also presented.

== Health care and education ==
Seven GP doctors and six dentists work in the Garmen municipality area with no hospitals nearby. Two high schools in Garmen and Ribnovo and six primary schools Ognyanovo, Debren, Gorno Dryanovo, Dolno Dryanovo, Hvostyane and Dabnitsa, all of them municipal, form the educational base of the community. There are several kindergartens, too. Public libraries are functioning in the community centers in the villages.

== Attractions ==
Garmen municipality includes the remains of the ancient town of Nikopolis ad Nestum which was created in 106 by the Roman emperor Traian in honor of his victory over the Daci tribe. The name means "The city of the victory near Mesta". This is thought to be one of the most important settlements that connects the Aegean coast with the Thracian Valley. The town of Garmen also contains a very old plane that was named first in Bulgaria for Tree of the Year 2011 and second in the European Tree of the Year contest for 2011.

The Ognyanovo hot springs, with their curative properties, attract many visitors. There are two groups of springs in the village of Ognyanovo, the first is known as the "Town Baths" and is along the valley of the river Kanina and the second is the so-called "Village Baths". The "Town Baths" contain 14 springs while the "Village Baths" contains 3-4 springs and is situated one kilometer northeast of the village. The mineral water is clear, odourless and pleasant to drink. Its temperatures range between 35 °C to 40 °C. There are a number of hotels along the mineral waters and it is a great way to relax in both summer and winter.

The reserve "Tamnata Gora" (Dark Forest) is a declared and maintained reserve since 1999 which includes 30.2 hectares. It is situated 20 km southeast of the village of Kovachevitsa. It is the most valuable protected natural landmark in the area and preserves centuries old forests which include spruce, beech and fir trees. Some 92 plant species and 119 vertebrates of national, European and world significance are found here, these include the deer roe, marten, hazel dormouse, black stork, golden eagle, wood grouse, Rosalia longicorn and the wood ant.

"Koziyat Kamak" (Goat Stone) and "Chernata Skala" (Black Rock) are located by the village of Kovachevitsa and are declared landmarks in 1976. This is a beautiful area with conifers and weathered granite rock. There are a number of regular holes hewn into the rock which make scientists think that the area was used as a Thracian sanctuary.

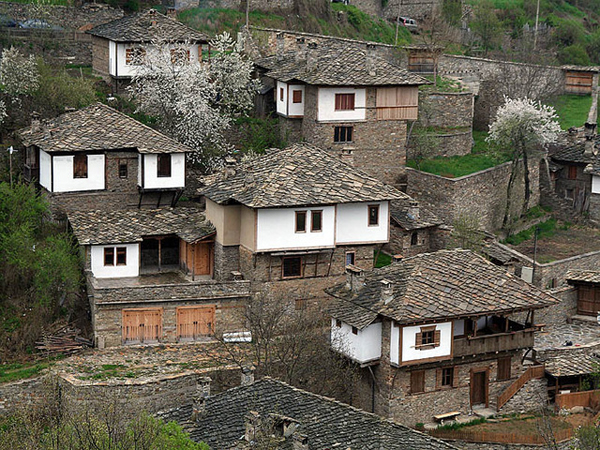
Kovachevitsa houses

The church of St. Nikola and other architectural treasures are in Kovachevitsa. This town was settled in the 15th century by Bulgarian emigrants and in the second half of the 18th century Bulgarian masters in masonry from the Kostursko region settled here and laid the foundations of a masonry center. The architecture is characterized by compact buildings and cobbled dead-end streets. The houses are covered with traditional stone slabs and six houses are declared cultural monuments of national significance. It is one of nine villages that have been entirely preserved Renaissance architecture in Bulgaria.

There are caves near Osikovo, and the main cave in the area is the Maoilovata Doupka cave. This cave is the longest in the Dabrash ridge in the Rhodopes. It is a cave rich in formations and it houses endangered bat species. Ten out of 32 bat species in the country have been found here. The average annual temperature of the cave is 8.7 °C and its length is 2,175 m.

Ribnovo, the largest village in the municipality is known for its traditional lifestyle and retention of national customs. This is the only village in the country to perform a special wedding traditions where the bride paints her face white with sequence and is presented to her new husband and the community.

There are also many hiking and eco-trails that were created through the project entitled "New Livelihood Alternatives For the Municipality of Garmen and Bosilovo Through Sustainable Tourism Development. This project was develop by the Municipality of Garmen along with the environmental NGO Borrowed Nature.

== Flora and fauna ==
The municipality of Garmen consists of 70% forests, which is 281,288 decares of land. Conifers are the main trees found here which include black pine, Scots pine, spruce, fir, white fir and European larch. There is also a variety of other trees which include willow, grey and black alder, poplars, hornbeam, oriental hornbeam, downy oak, lime, sessile oak, beech, acacia, birch, plane (sycamore), osier, etc. There is also a wide variety of bush and grass, and you can find 50% of all the varieties of medicinal plants that grow in Bulgaria here; you can also find fungi and berries as well. Some rare and protected plants found in the municipality include Geum Rhodopaeum, Bulgarian Bush Cinquefoil and Lathraea Rodopaea, green foxglove, etc.

Fauna in the area include red deer, deer roe, wild boar, bears, wolves, otters and a small amount of other large and small game. The municipality also contains part of the NATURA 2000 Network-"Mesta Zone" which is in the northern part of the municipality along the valley of the river Kanina. In this area you can find various birds species which include the black stork, short toed eagle, golden eagle, long-legged buzzard, black woodpecker, crag martin and the red-rumped swallow. There are also a number of bat species that are under protection which include Bechstein bat and the Barbastelle bat.
