= Nicopolis ad Nestum =

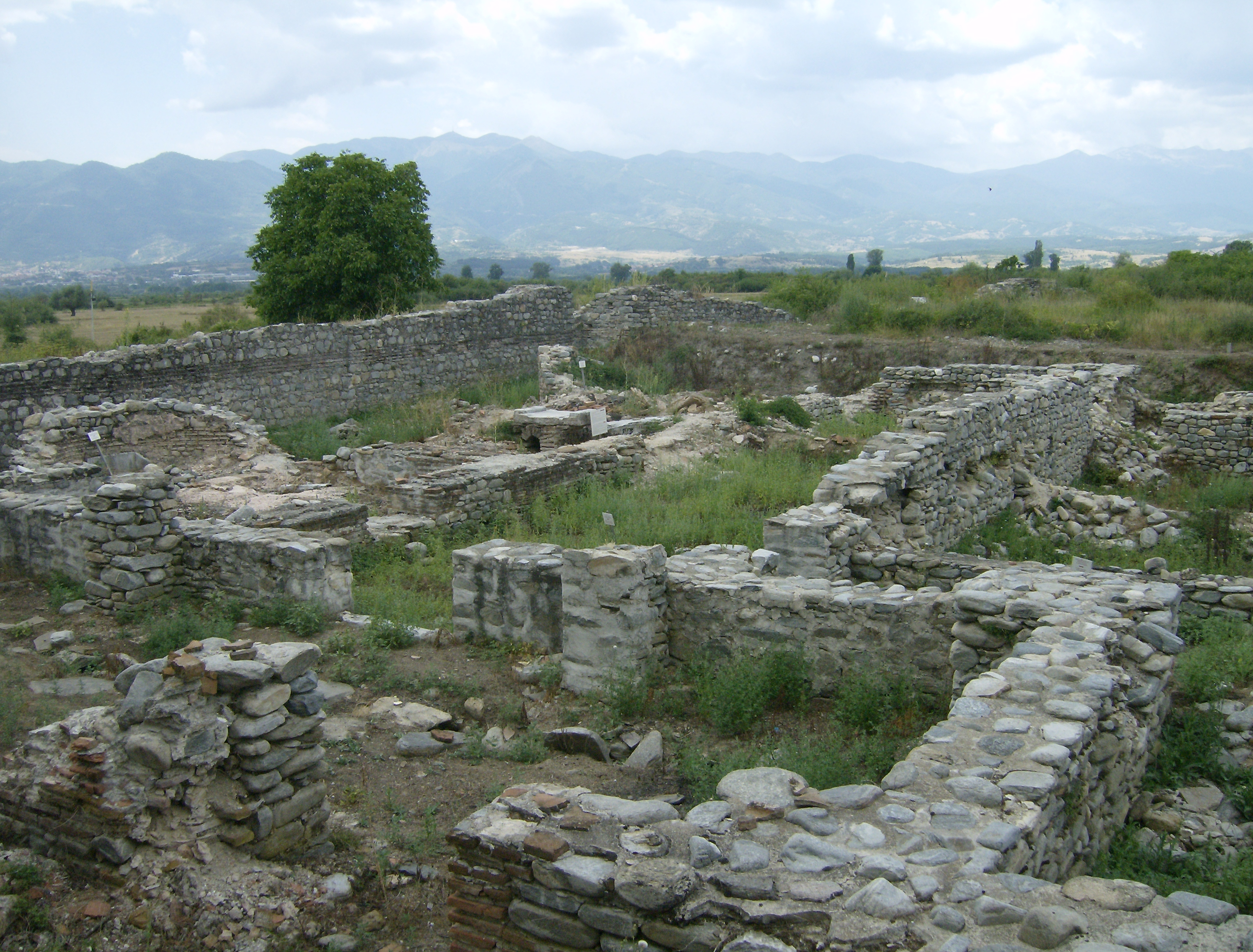

- Location within Bulgaria
- 41°35′44″N 23°47′45″E
- Type: Settlement
- Region: Thrace

Nicopolis ad Nestum (Ancient Greek: Νικόπολις ἡ περὶ Νέστον, Nikópolis hē perì Néston) or Nicopolis ad Mestum, is a ruined Roman town in the province of Thracia (Thrace) near to the modern village of Garmen on the left bank of the Mesta river, in Garmen Municipality, Bulgaria. Although “ad Nestum” is the more commonly used alternative, “ad Mestum” (which is what appears, in Greek, on the coins of the city) is the correct form of the name during the Roman period.

== Nicopolis ==
The town was one of two fortified towns founded to mark Emperor Trajan’s victory in 105-106 AD over the Dacians. The area had been inhabited for about 14 centuries and attained its peak in late antiquity (4th-6th centuries AD). The original town occupied about 25-30 decаres. The Slavs destroyed Nicopolis in the 6th-7th centuries but it re-emerged as a medieval settlement in the late 10th century.

Excavations have cleared 280 metres of fortress walls, administrative and religious buildings and tumuli. Several archaeological finds have been made, including a votive relief of the Thracian horseman, a statuette of Hermes, an old Christian tumulus, over 95 gold and 22 other coins, glass, bronze and ceramic vessels and a ritual table. Some of these findings can be seen in the historical museum at Gotse Delchev. Close to Nicopolis ad Mestum there are remains of two early Christian basilica (4th century AD), which are believed to be part of the same site. The basilicas have mosaic floors with geometric and natural motifs.

Nicopolis ad Mestum issued coins only once, under Caracalla and Geta, with heads of Caracalla, Geta and (more rarely) their mother Julia Domna on the obverses and mostly fairly standard reverse types of Tyche, Hygieia, Ares, Nemesis, etc. Coins of other rulers (e.g. Commodus) referred to in some catalogs are forgeries or misread coins of other cities. Battered coins of Nicopolis ad Istrum in Lower Moesia, perhaps the most prolific mint in the Roman Balkans in the early third century, are often mistaken for issues of Mestum.

The emission of coins from Nicopolis ad Mestum has been dated to the year 211, more precisely to the period between the death of Septimius Severus in February and the murder of Geta in December, by the German scholar Holger Komnick, author of the only comprehensive study of the coinage of this city (in the series Griechisches Münzwerk of the Berlin-Brandenburg Academy of Sciences and Humanities).

This German-language publication has been reviewed by Francis Jarman in the March 2004 issue of The Celator. There is a listing of many of the types, with photographs, in Varbanov's catalog of Roman provincial coins from the Balkans; however, the descriptions are often inaccurate, and Varbanov's estimates of rarity and value should be ignored. All the coins of Nicopolis ad Mestum are rare, and some extremely so. Komnick listed only 237 in his catalog, and Jarman refers to a "grand total of about 300 [known coins]".

In 2020, researchers reassembled and translated a Greek inscription on a fragmented stone stela discovered in the city in 1923. The inscription is a letter from the Roman emperor Septimius Severus and his son Caracalla thanking the people of the city for a donation of 700,000 denarii. According to the archaeologists, the emperor treated the bribe as a gift from the people, who wanted to gain the ruler’s favor because they had supported one of his rivals in 193 A.D.
