= Skrebatno =

Skrebatno Скребатно
- Village
- Location within Bulgaria
- Coordinates: 41°39′N 23°48′E
- Country: Bulgaria
- Province: Blagoevgrad Province
- Municipality: Garmen

Government
  - Suffragan Mayor: Iskra Avdikova

Area
  - Total: 38.147 km^{2} (14.729 sq mi)
- Elevation: 725 m (2,379 ft)

Population (15 December 2011)
  - Total: 280
- GRAO
- Time zone: UTC+2 (EET)
  - Summer (DST): UTC+3 (EEST)
- Postal Code: 2964
- Area code: 07523

Skrebatno is a village in Garmen Municipality, in Blagoevgrad Province, Bulgaria. It is situated in the foothills of the Dabrash part of the Rhodope Mountains. It is 7 kilometers north of Garmen and 71 kilometers from Blagoevgrad.

There were 110 inhabitants at the end of the 15th century. In 1900 there were 1070 people and 290 of them were Pomak. The Sveta Petka church was built in 1835 and is a monument of local artistic and cultural significance.

Children go to school in Ribnovo. There is a community center with a public library and a small local ethnographic museum.
