= Leshten =

Leshten Лещен
- Village
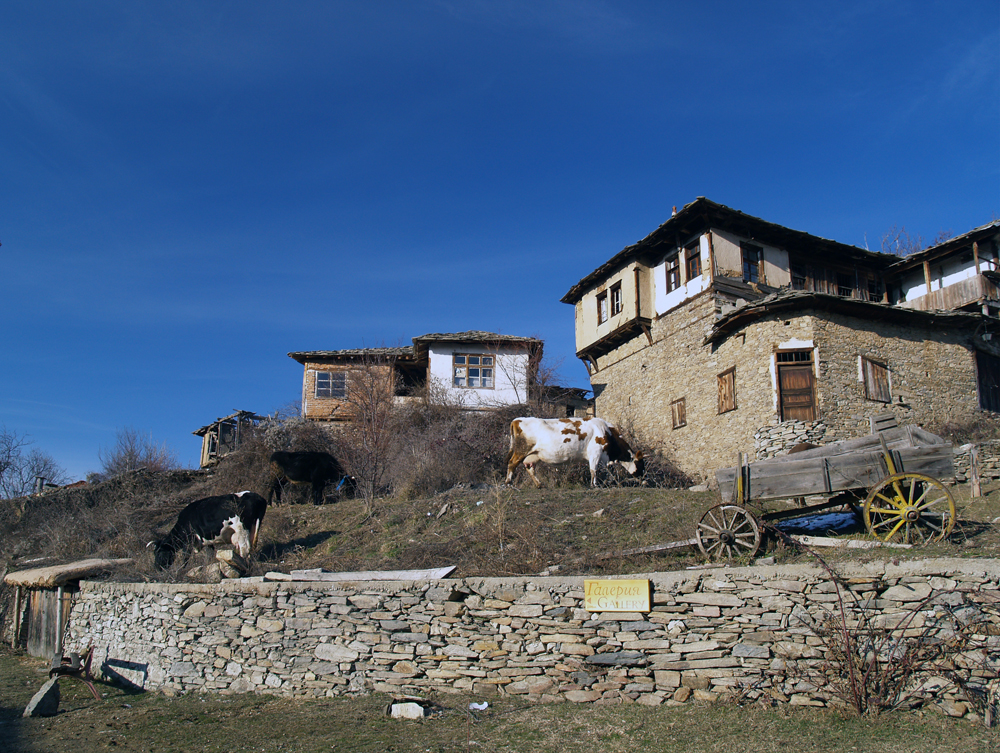

- Location within Bulgaria
- Coordinates: 41°38′N 23°50′E
- Country: Bulgaria
- Province: Blagoevgrad Province
- Municipality: Garmen

Government
  - Suffragan Mayor: Isuf Mutishev

Area
  - Total: 16,569 km^{2} (6,397 sq mi)
- Elevation: 1,093 m (3,586 ft)

Population (15 December 2011)
  - Total: 11
- GRAO
- Time zone: UTC+2 (EET)
  - Summer (DST): UTC+3 (EEST)
- Postal Code: 2962
- Area code: 07527
- Website: https://web.archive.org/web/20100801153656/http://leshten.hit.bg/

Leshten (Bulgarian: Лещен) is a mountainous village in Garmen Municipality, in Blagoevgrad Province, Bulgaria. It is situated in the Dabrash part of the Rhodope Mountains, 5 kilometers north of Garmen, 75 kilometers southeast of Blagoevgrad and 2 kilometers south of Gorno Dryanovo on the road between Garmen and Kovachevitsa.

In the early years of the 20th century it was a busy village with more than 500 inhabitants, most of them non-Muslim. Nowadays there are only a few local permanent inhabitants, but many of the old houses have been restored and renovated as summerhouses or guest-houses. They were built in the second half of the 19th and the beginning of the 20th century in the architectural style typical for this region of the country. Most of the houses have very big terraces, inner courtyards and their own taverns.

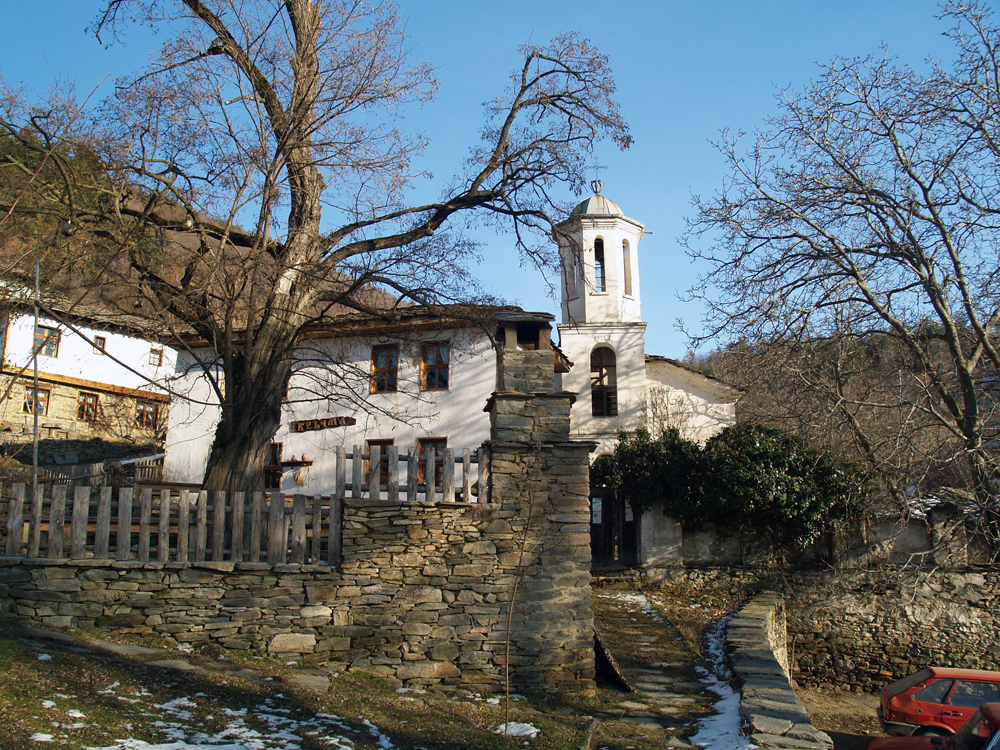

The church "St Paraskeva" was built in 1837 and a school, run by the local priest has been added to it. Now the church is recognised as an Architectural and Cultural Monument of local importance. The school building has been converted to a pub, offering local cuisine and drinks.

The village is accessible by bus or by car, but the road is difficult in the winter.
