= Dolno Dryanovo =

Dolno Dryanovo Долно Дряново
- Village
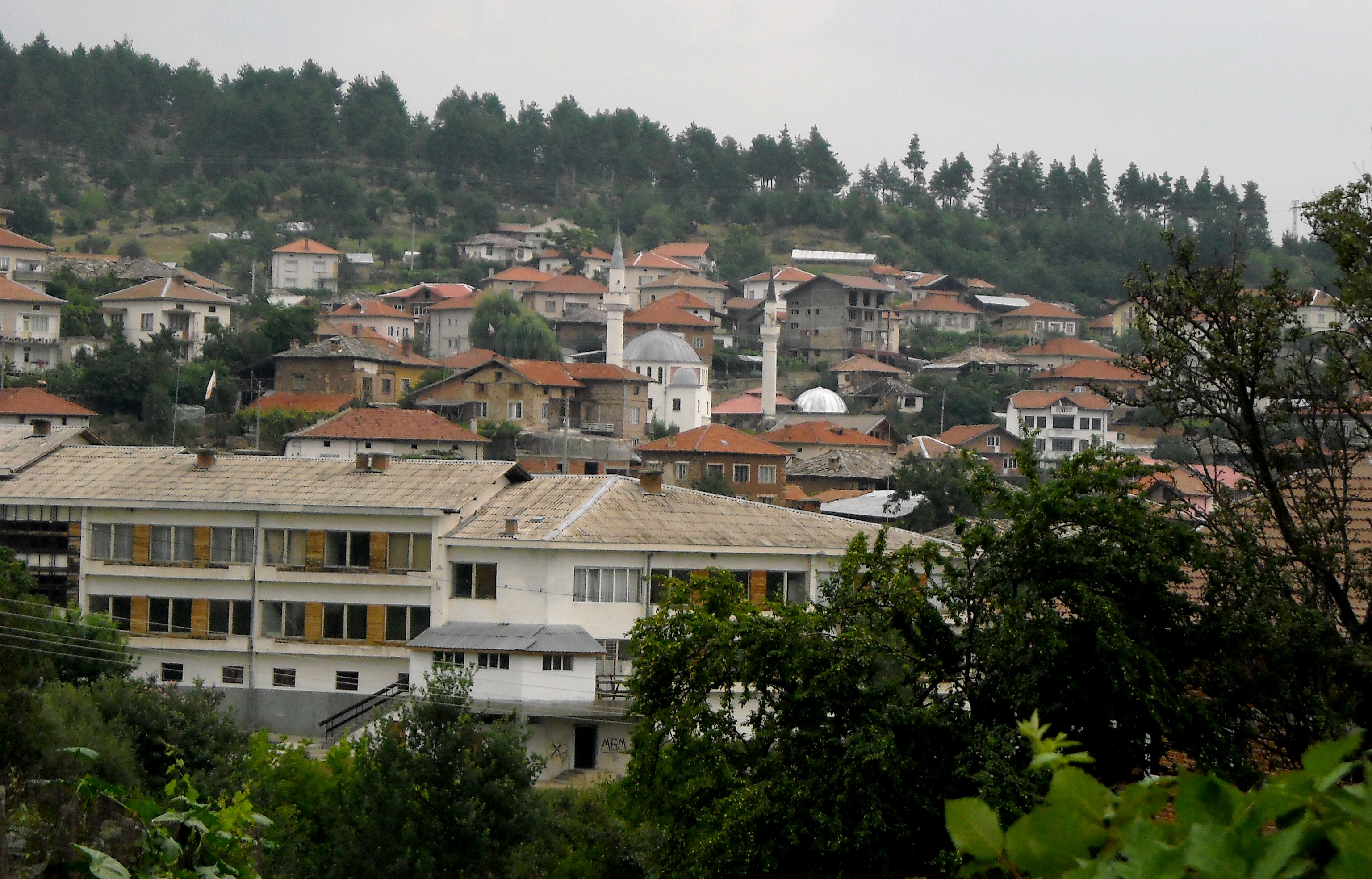

- Location within Bulgaria
- Coordinates: 41.588°N 23.8978°E
- Country: Bulgaria
- Province: Blagoevgrad Province
- Municipality: Garmen

Government
  - Mayor: Erhan Sherif (GERB)

Area
  - Total: 13,497 km^{2} (5,211 sq mi)
- Elevation: 702 m (2,303 ft)

Population (15 June 2013)
  - Total: 1,253
- GRAO
- Time zone: UTC+2 (EET)
  - Summer (DST): UTC+3 (EEST)
- Postal Code: 2944
- Area code: 07531

Dolno Dryanovo is a village in Garmen Municipality, in Blagoevgrad Province, Bulgaria. It is situated in the Dabrash ridge of the Rhodope Mountains some 7 kilometers east-southeast of Garmen and 82 kilometers southeast of Blagoevgrad on the third class road Gotse Delchev-Satovcha-Dospat. It is located close to the river Chechka Bistritsa.

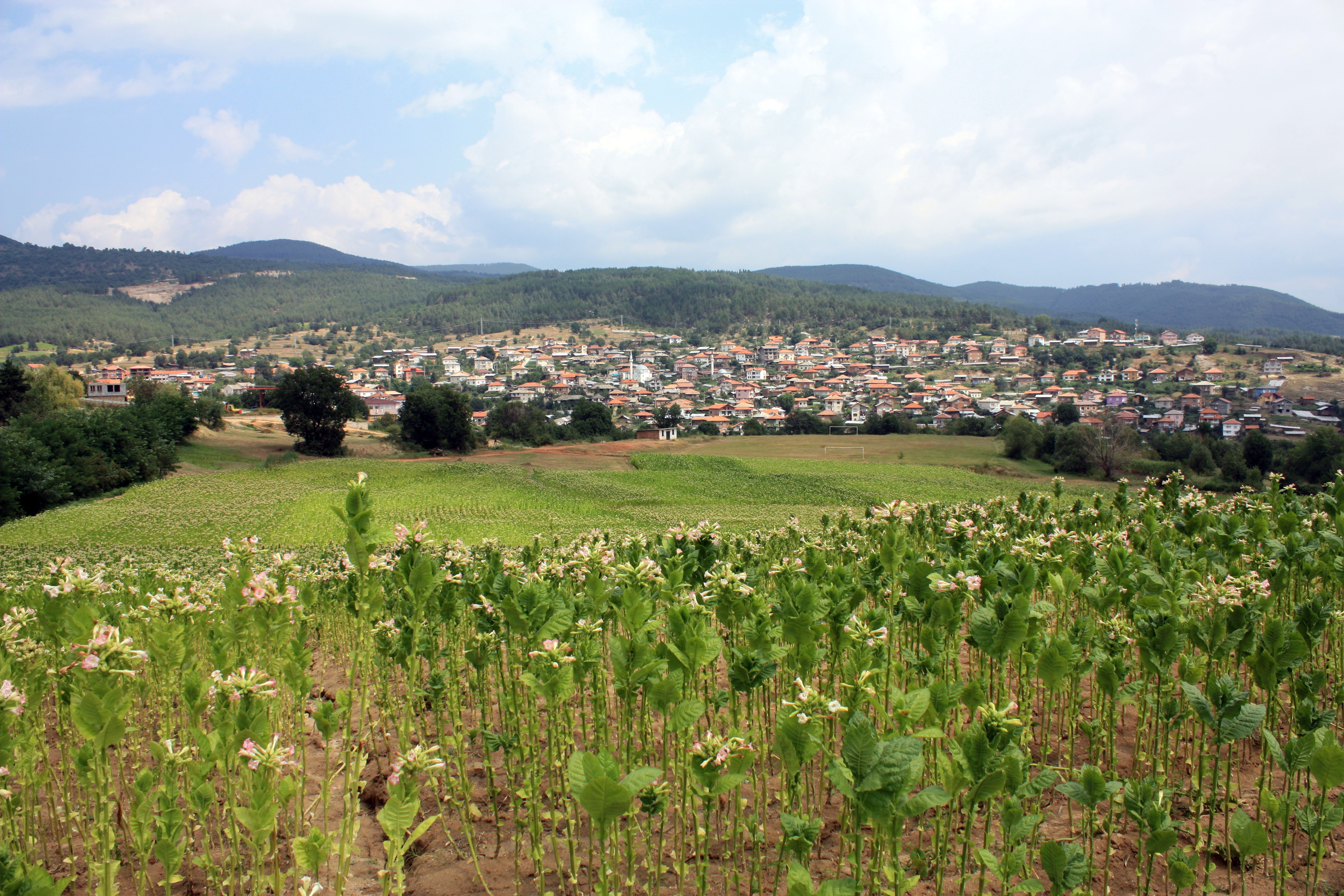
The Village

== History and religion ==
The village was first mentioned in 1636 year in the Ottoman registers. The people are Muslim of Pomak origin. There are two mosques raised in the center of the village. The older mosque was built before more than 500 years and was restored in 2008. The newer one was built in 1998 and is one of the biggest in the Chech region.

== Education and health care ==
The Primary school "Hristo Botev" was renovated in 2011 year. There is a kindergarten and a community center with a public library and amateur folklore dances formations for men and women. The health care is provided by a general practitioner doctor and a dental clinic.

== Tourism ==
- Stone heads sanctuary - it is a newly discovered prehistoric sanctuary, combined with a Thracian sanctuary. There are several stone figurines, that was thought to be a natural phenomenon, but it appeared that they are human-made. The sanctuary is located 2.5 kilometers northeast of the village.
- 500-year-old mosque in the center of the village.
