= Dabnitsa =

Dabnitsa Дъбница
- Village
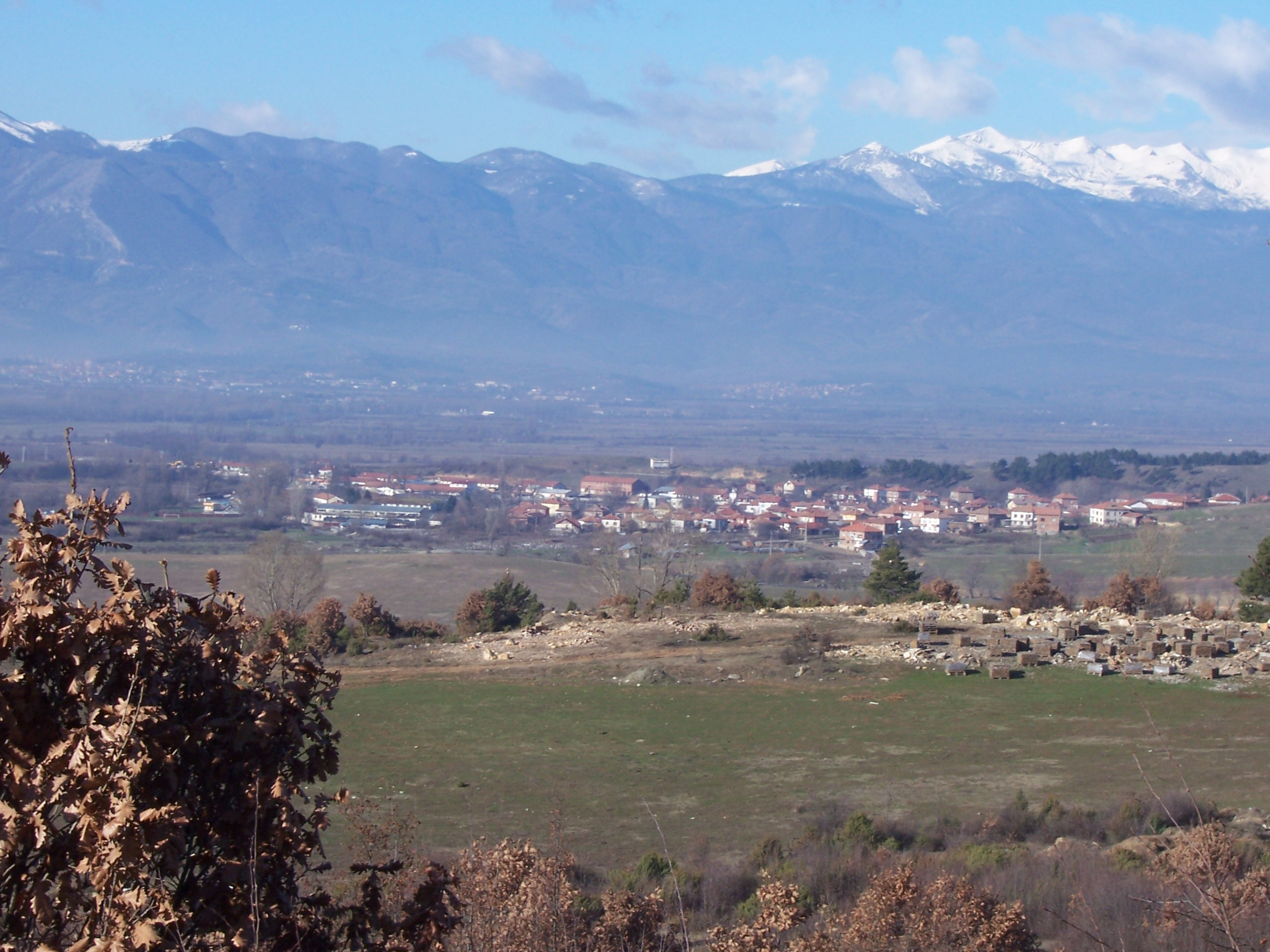

- Location within Bulgaria
- Coordinates: 41°34′N 23°50′E
- Country: Bulgaria
- Province: Blagoevgrad Province
- Municipality: Garmen

Population (15-12-2011)
  - Total: 1,652
- GRAO

Dabnitsa is a village in Garmen Municipality, in Blagoevgrad Province, Bulgaria. It is situated in the Dabrash part of the Rhodope Mountains near Mesta river, 4 kilometers south-southeast of Garmen and 79 kilometers southeast of Blagoevgrad.

The area has been inhabited during the Thracian and Roman period and in the Second Bulgarian Empire. There are remains of an old fortress "St. Archangel" (Bulgarian: Свети Архангел, Sveti Arhangel) 1 kilometer north of the village from that period. In Ottoman times it was called Dubniçe (Ottoman Turkish: دوبنيچه ).

Most of the people in Dabnitsa are of Slavic origin (Pomak) but often declare themselves as Turks, based on their Islamic religion, despite their mother language is Bulgarian.
