= Kovachevitsa =

Kovachevitsa Ковачевица
- Village
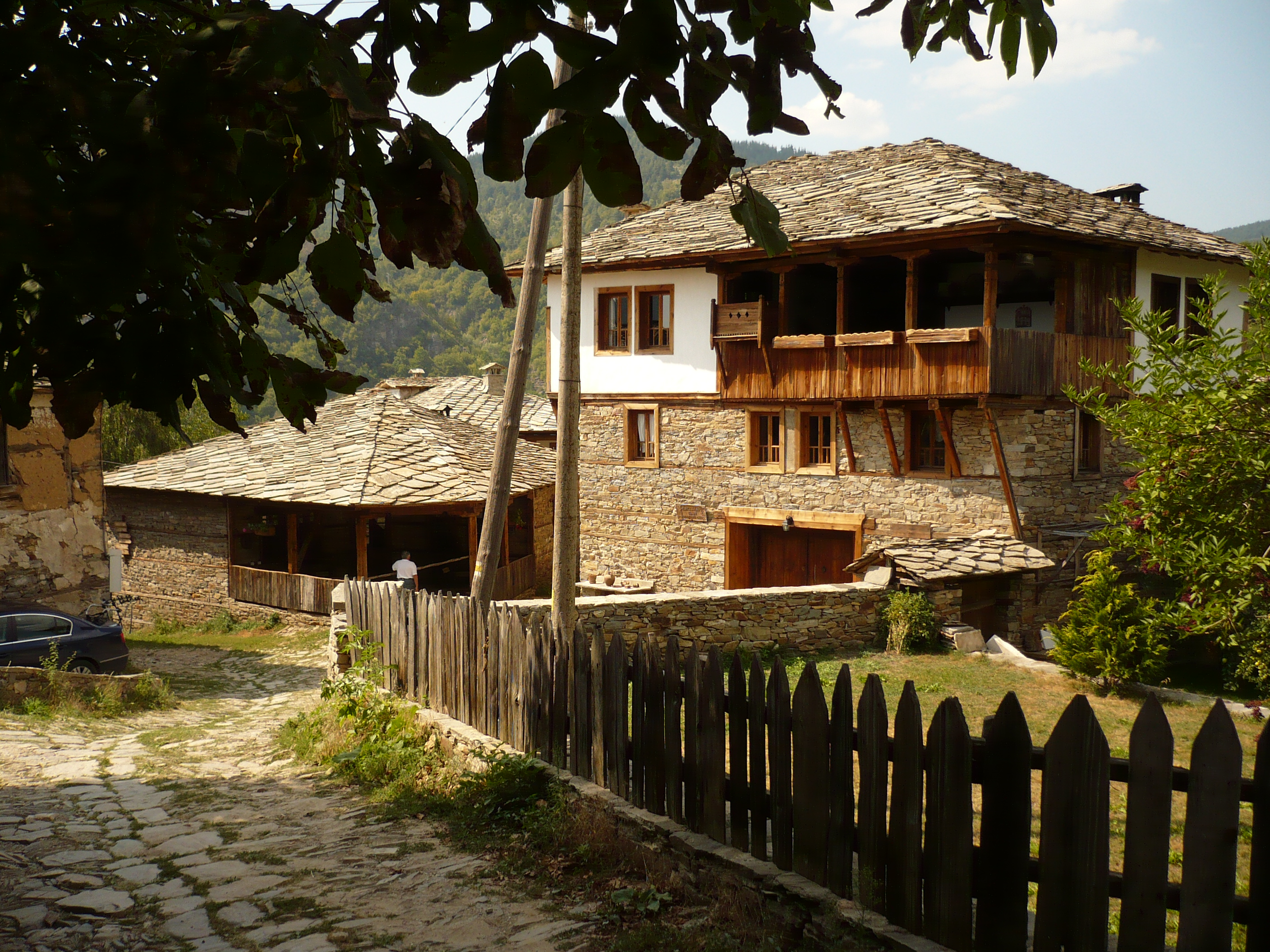

- Location within Bulgaria
- Coordinates: 41°41′N 23°50′E
- Country: Bulgaria
- Province: Blagoevgrad Province
- Municipality: Garmen

Government
  - Suffragan Mayor: Kiril Zhuglev

Area
  - Total: 11,706 km^{2} (4,520 sq mi)

Population (15 December 2011)
  - Total: 35
- GRAO
- Time zone: UTC+2 (EET)
  - Summer (DST): UTC+3 (EEST)
- Postal Code: 2969
- Area code: 07527
- Website: http://kovachevica.com/en/

Kovachevitsa (Bulgarian: Ковачевица; also transliterated Kovačevica) is a village in Garmen Municipality, in Blagoevgrad Province, Bulgaria.

== Geography ==
The village is situated in the Dabrash part of the Rhodope Mountains in the steep valley of the Kanina river, 9 kilometers north of Garmen, 71 kilometers southeast of Blagoevgrad and 119 kilometers southeast of Sofia.

== History ==
The village was founded by refugees from different villages, who tried to escape the Ottoman assimilation in the 17th century. The isolated location and the fresh water supply were the most important factors in this process. The village has never had Ottoman administration, therefore it preserved the Bulgarian traditions.

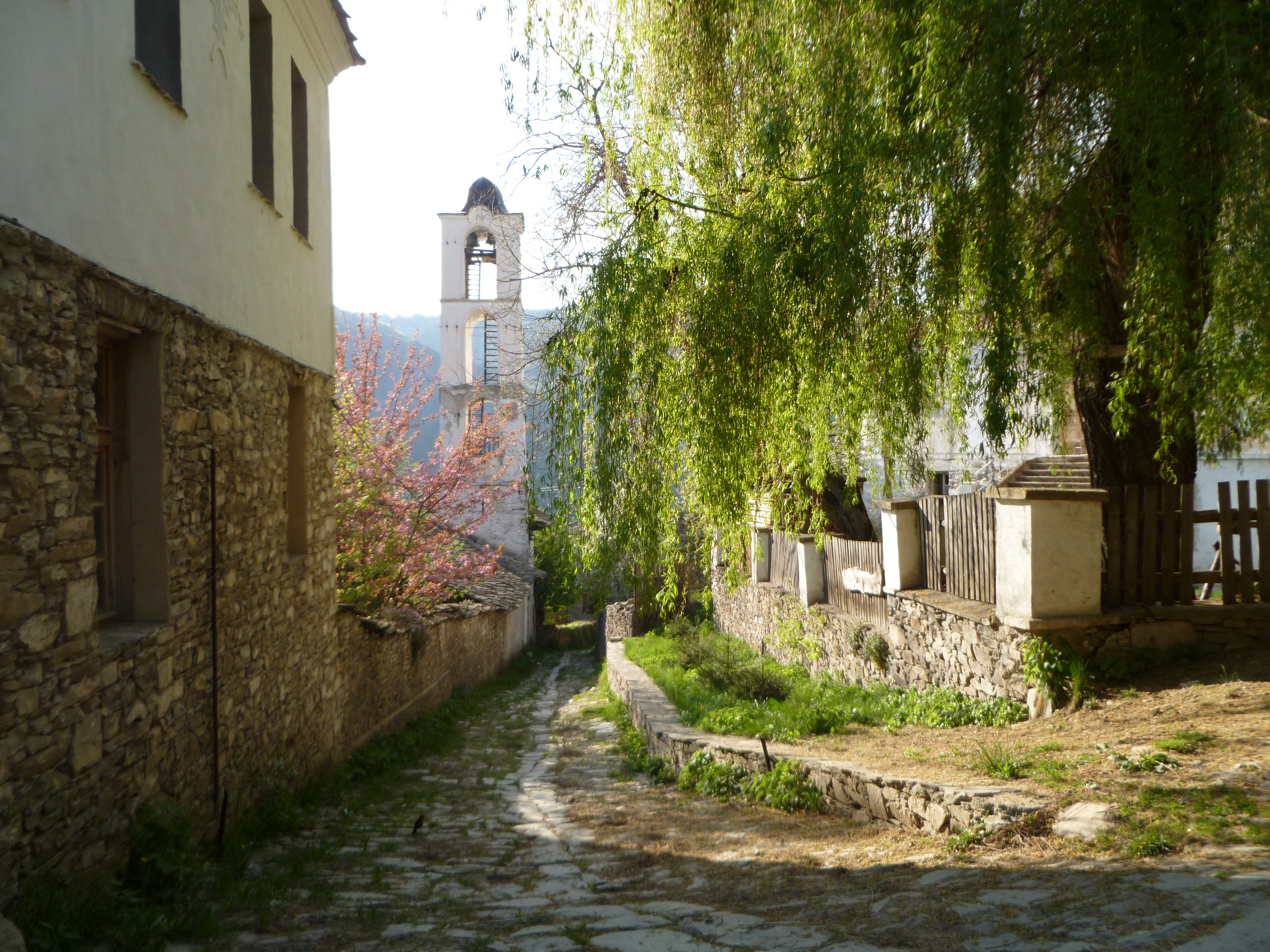

St. Nicholas' church (Bulgarian: Свети Никола, Sveti Nikola) was built in 1847 and a bell-tower was built in 1900. The church has been designated as a national cultural monument.

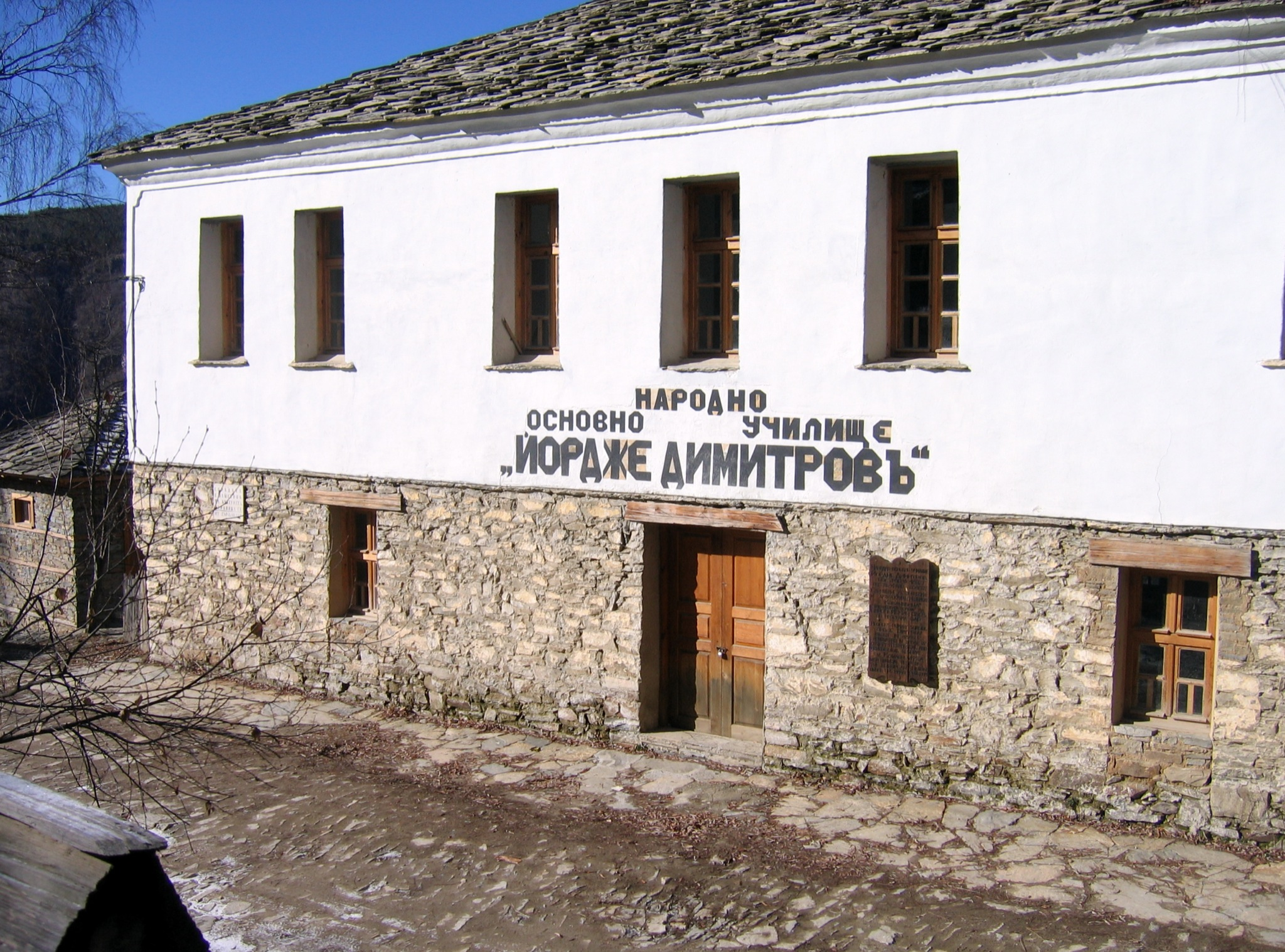
The school building

The first school was founded in 1820 and run by priests. In 1854, a secular school was founded. The school moved to a new two-story house in 1888. Nowadays the school is no longer operating because the lack of children; the building is preserved as a museum.

== Architecture ==
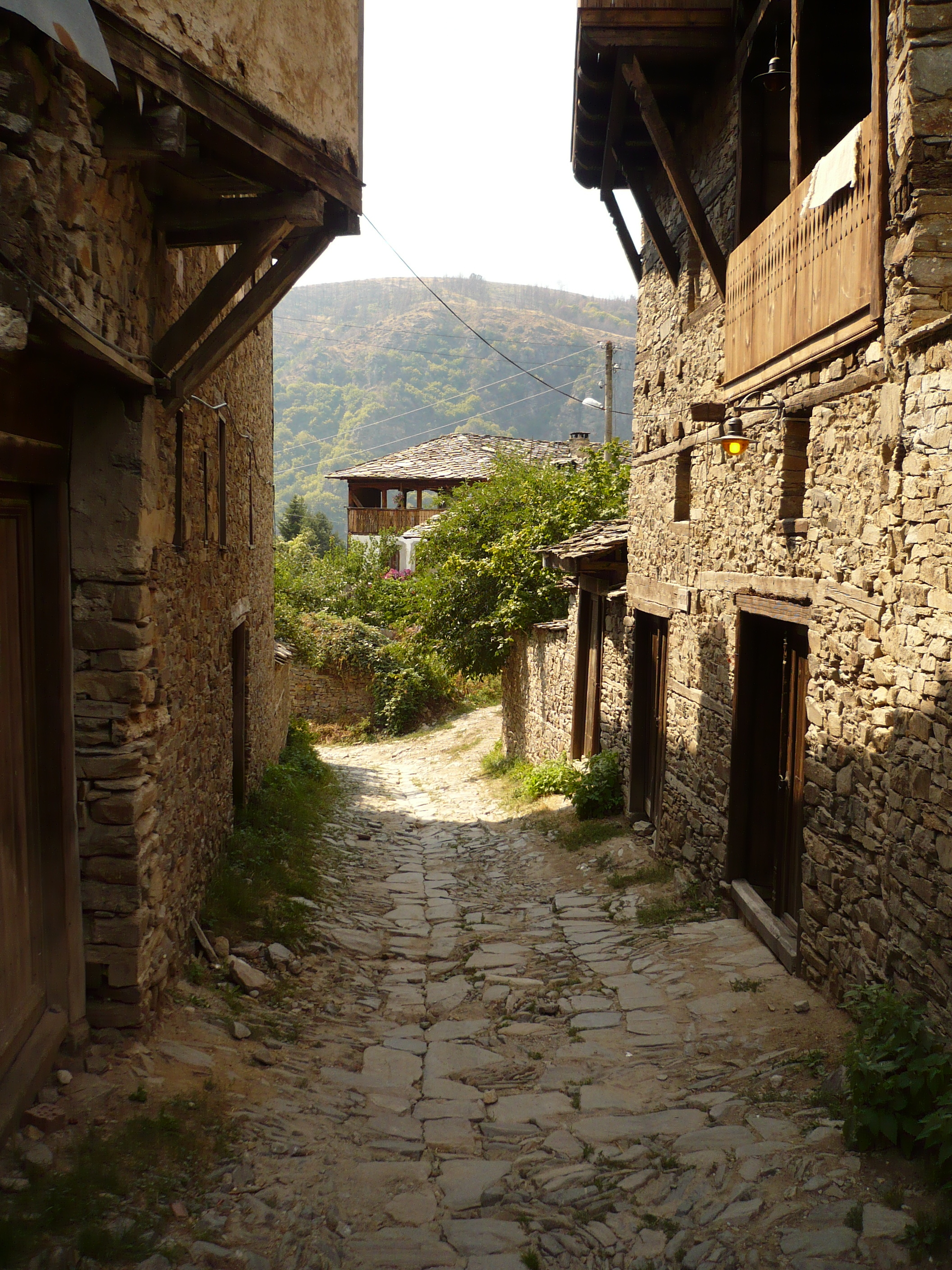

The architecture of the houses is original and unique. Most of them were built in the second half of the 19th century, but there are also new houses, built in the same style. The village was designated an "Architectural and Historical Reserve of National Importance" in 1977. Many Bulgarian movies have been filmed there.

== Population ==
The population at the end of the 15th and the beginning of the 16th centuries was 17 persons. In 1873 the population was 630. In 1905, there were 1740 inhabitants, most of them Bulgarian. Since the middle of the 20th century the population has decreased very quickly. Most of the inhabitants went to bigger towns and cities. Many of the houses were abandoned and began to fall apart. After the village was re-found by Bulgarian cinematography and the new status of the village as a National reserve, many houses were rehabilitated and even new houses were built, but in the same architectural style. Now the village has only about 30 constant inhabitants, but actually a lot more live there in the Summer and during the vacations and holidays.

== Tourism ==
There are many guest-houses and restaurants in the traditional style. The village itself is not the only place of interest. There are many natural sites in the Rhodopes and in the valley of the Kanina river. Tourists can visit Leshten – another historical village in the area - as well as the Natural reserve "Temnata gora" and many other places in Garmen Municipality.
