= The Celator =

- Cover of February 2010 issue
- Type: Monthly
- Format: Magazine
- Editor: Wayne Sayles (1987–1999); Kerry Wetterstrom (1999–2012)
- Founded: 1987
- Language: English
- Headquarters: Lancaster, PA
- ISSN: 1048-0986
- Website: The Celator

The Celator was a monthly magazine covering ancient coins and the ancient coin market. It was founded in 1987 by coin dealer Wayne Sayles in a newsprint format. The Celator was then edited and published by Kerry Wetterstrom in magazine format. From 1988 to 1995 a yearly Best of The Celator was printed. The magazine was based in Lancaster, Pennsylvania.

The Celator ceased publication in 2012.

The Celator won awards from the Numismatic Literary Guild including Best Column (in 2004 and 2005), Best Article (in 2005 and 2006), and Best Issue (in 2006).
