= Ognyanovo, Blagoevgrad Province =

Ognyanovo Огняново
- Village
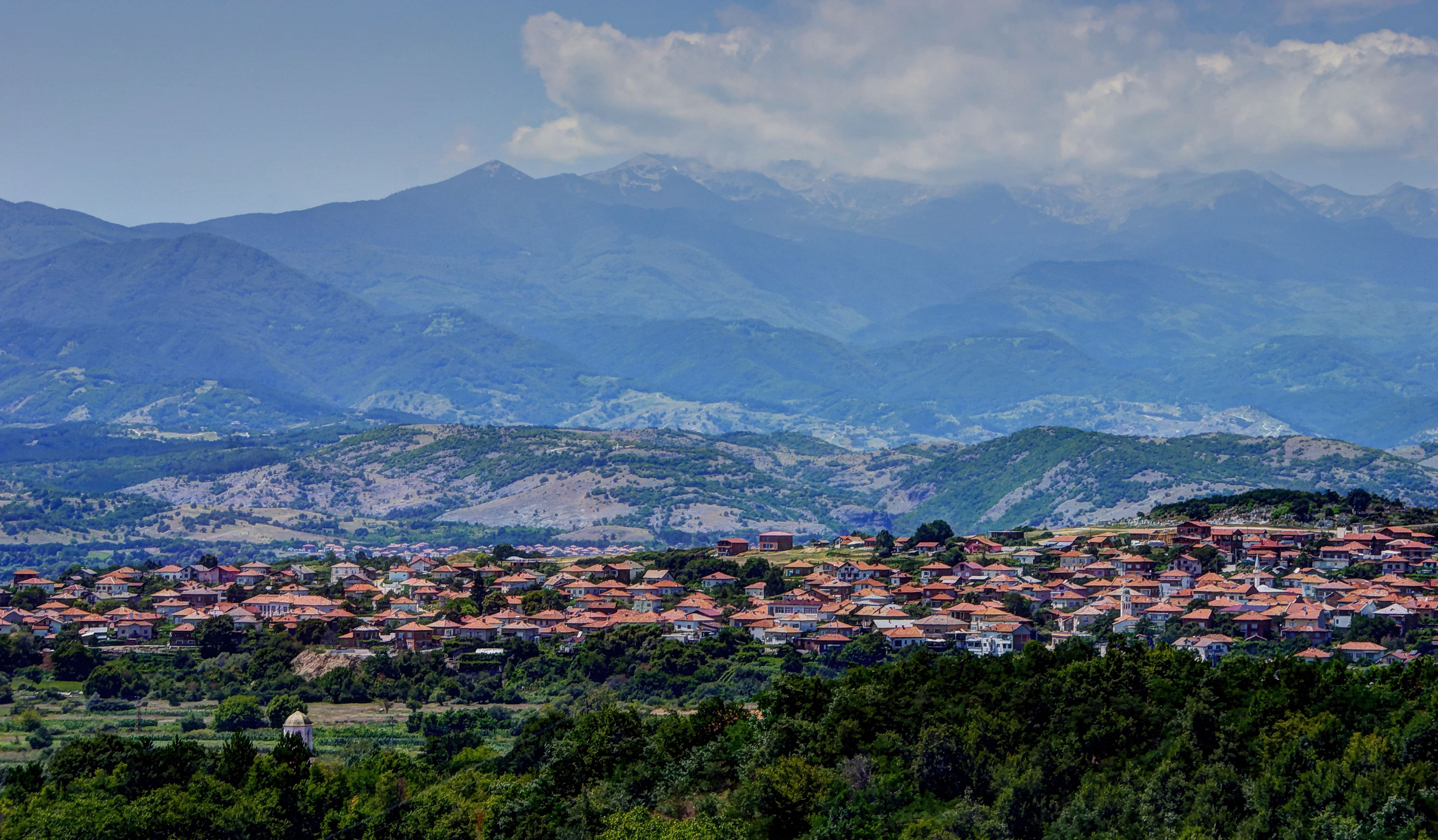

- Location within Bulgaria
- Coordinates: 41°37′N 23°48′E
- Country: Bulgaria
- Province: Blagoevgrad Province
- Municipality: Garmen

Government
  - Mayor: Dimitria Gyurova (SDS)

Area
  - Total: 10.394 km^{2} (4.013 sq mi)

Population (15 December 2011)
  - Total: 1,528
- GRAO
- Time zone: UTC+2 (EET)
  - Summer (DST): UTC+3 (EEST)
- Postal Code: 2947
- Area code: 07523
- Website: http://ognyanovo.com/ (In Bulgarian)

Ognyanovo is a resort village with thermal mineral water springs in Garmen Municipality, in Blagoevgrad Province, Bulgaria.

== Geography ==
The village is situated in the valley of Mesta river in the skirts of the Dabrash part of the Rhodope Mountains. The village is 3 kilometers north of Garmen and together with Marchevo the three villages are almost merged. Ognyanovo is laying 72 kilometers southeast of Blagoevgrad and 125 kilometers southeast of Sofia.

== History ==
The mineral water has been discovered in the Roman times. There are remains of Roman baths. Also a medieval village and a watching tower remains have been unearthed near the village. The Roman town Nicopolis ad Nestum is just few kilometers south of the village.

The village was named Fotovishta until 1934 and Ognenovo until 1966. It was mentioned for first time in the Ottoman documents as Hotovishta in 1478-1479 as Christian village with 1 Muslim and 53 non-Muslim households. In the 19th century people of Pomak origin came from other Muslim villages. In 1835 was built the church "Assumption of Virgin Mary" (Bulgarian: Успение Богородично, Uspenie Bogorodichno). Some of the icons were painted by Dimitar Molerov. In 1859 was opened the first school. In 1908-1909 there were 103 Bulgarian households with 303 inhabitants and 40 pomak households with 200 inhabitants.

After 1912 year the village was gained from the Ottoman Turks and the region became part of Bulgaria. Refugees from Macedonia came to Fotovishta after parts of the region became part of Greece. In 1934 the village was renamed Ognenovo. In 1966 the village was named with its present name Ognyanovo.

== Institutions ==
Ognyanovo is governed by Mayor. The current Mayor, since 2003 is Dimitria Gyurova. There is a post office. The health care is provided by two doctors - a general practitioner and a dentist, and also a pharmacy. The primary school "Peyo Yavorov" was opened in 1929 and initially was named after Boris Sarafov. In 1944 the school was renamed to "Asen Zlatarov". There is also a kindergarten and a community center with a public library. The amateur football club "Mineral" plays in the regional amateur league.

== Mineral water ==
There are two groups of thermal mineral water springs. One of them, called "Miroto" is formed by 17 springs with temperature of 42°C. The remains of old Roman bath has been unearthed at that location. The other group of 7 springs are colder 16-40°C. The water is clear, colourless, with a slight smell of hydrogen sulfide.

== Tourism ==
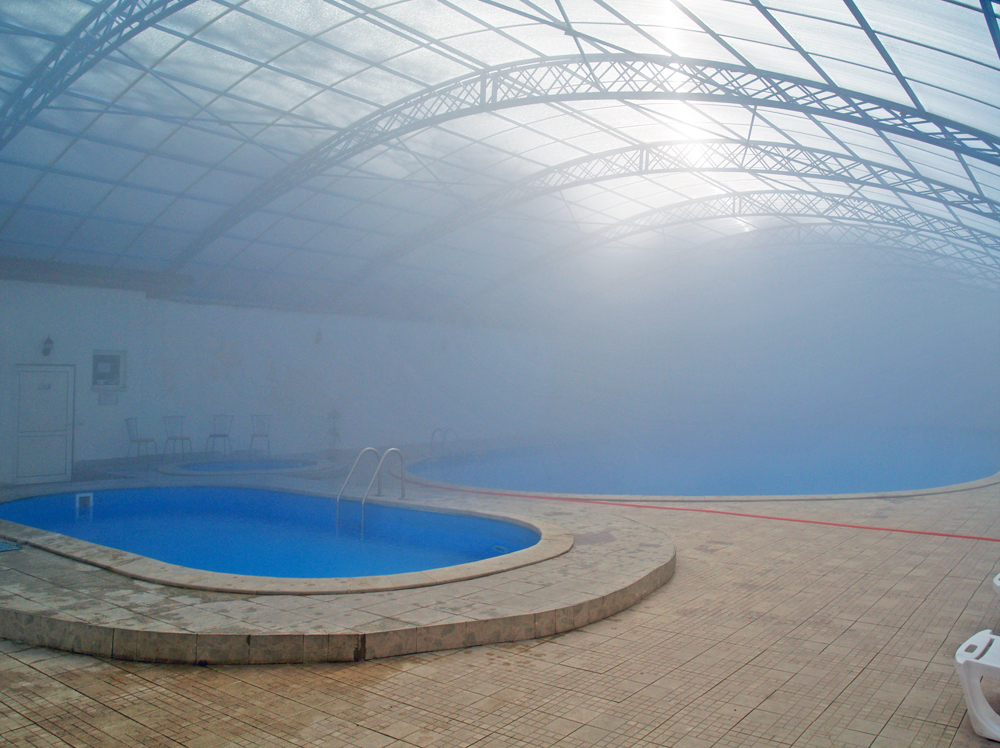
Mineral water swimming pools in Ognyanovo

There is a hotel, few guest-houses and a sanatorium. The village is not far from Kovachevitsa and Leshten - two villages with old preserved and reconstructed houses from the 19th and 20th centuries.
