= Satovcha =

Satovcha Сатовча
- Village
- Coat of arms

- Location of Satovcha in Bulgaria
- Coordinates: 41°37′N 23°59′E
- Country: Bulgaria
- Province (Oblast): Blagoevgrad
- Municipality (Obshtina): Satovcha

Government
  - Mayor: Arben Mimenov (MRF)

Area
  - Total: 55.373 km^{2} (21.380 sq mi)
- Elevation: 1,029 m (3,376 ft)

Population (2010-12-15)
  - Total: 2,021
- Time zone: UTC+2 (EET)
  - Summer (DST): UTC+3 (EEST)
- Postal Code: 2950
- Area code: 07541
- Vehicle registration: E

Satovcha (Bulgarian: Сатовча, old version: Satovitsa, Svatovitsa) is a village in Southwestern Bulgaria. It is the administrative center of the Satovcha Municipality in Blagoevgrad Province.

== Geography ==
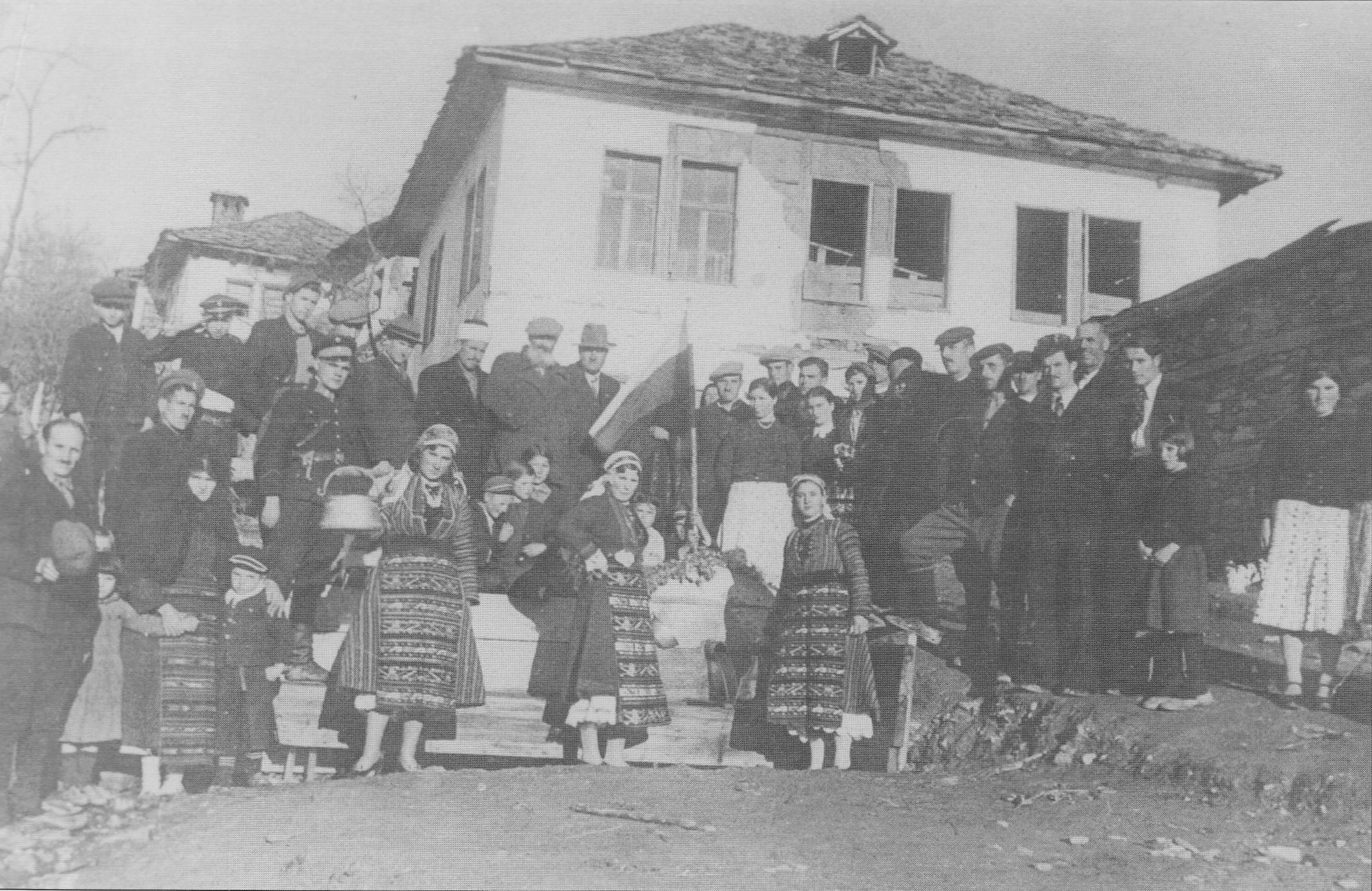
The opening of the first well in the village of Satovcha - 1935.

The village of Satovcha is located in the Western Rhodope Mountains. It belongs to the Chech region.

== History ==
According to Vasil Kanchov, in 1900, Satovcha was populated by 832 Bulgarian Muslims and 650 Bulgarian Christians.

== Religions ==
Both Muslims and Christians inhabit the village.

== Popular culture ==
The village has greatly expanded in the last few years in aspects such as hotels, restaurants, supermarkets, and the town center. The main hotel serving the municipality is the three star Zenit hotel. The village is home to three supermarkets.

Satovcha provides the background for the 2013 Bulgarian film "Soul Food Stories."

== Honours ==
Satovcha Peak in Antarctica is named after the village.
