= Garmen =

Garmen Гърмен (Bulgarian)
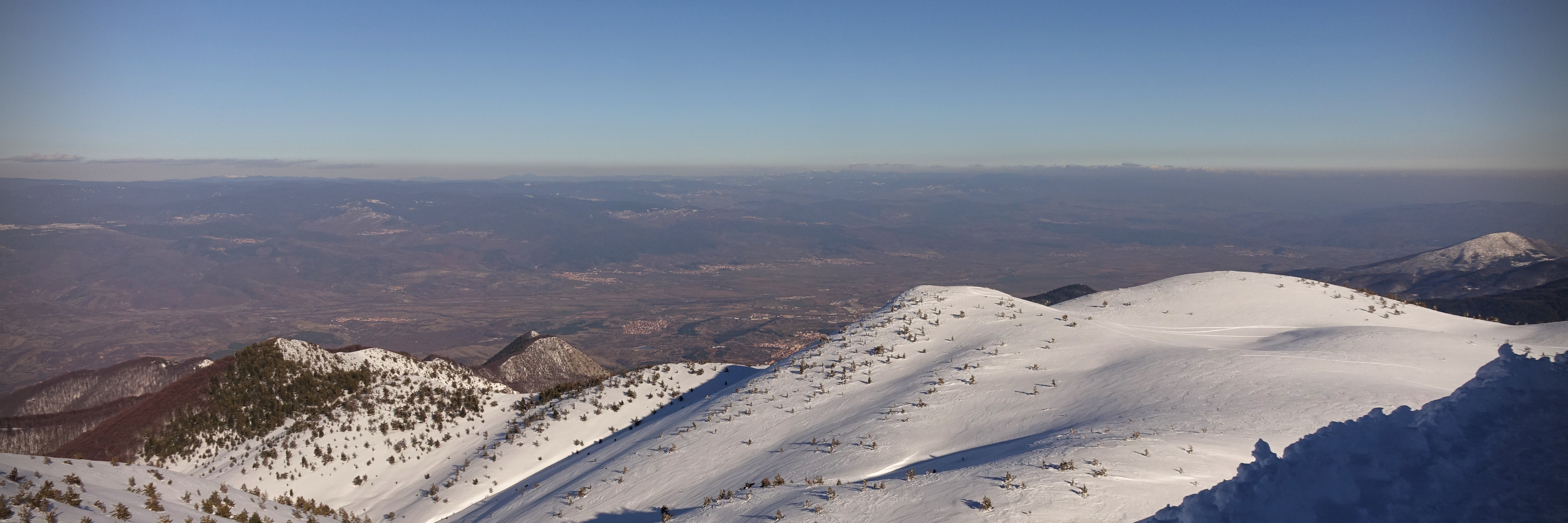
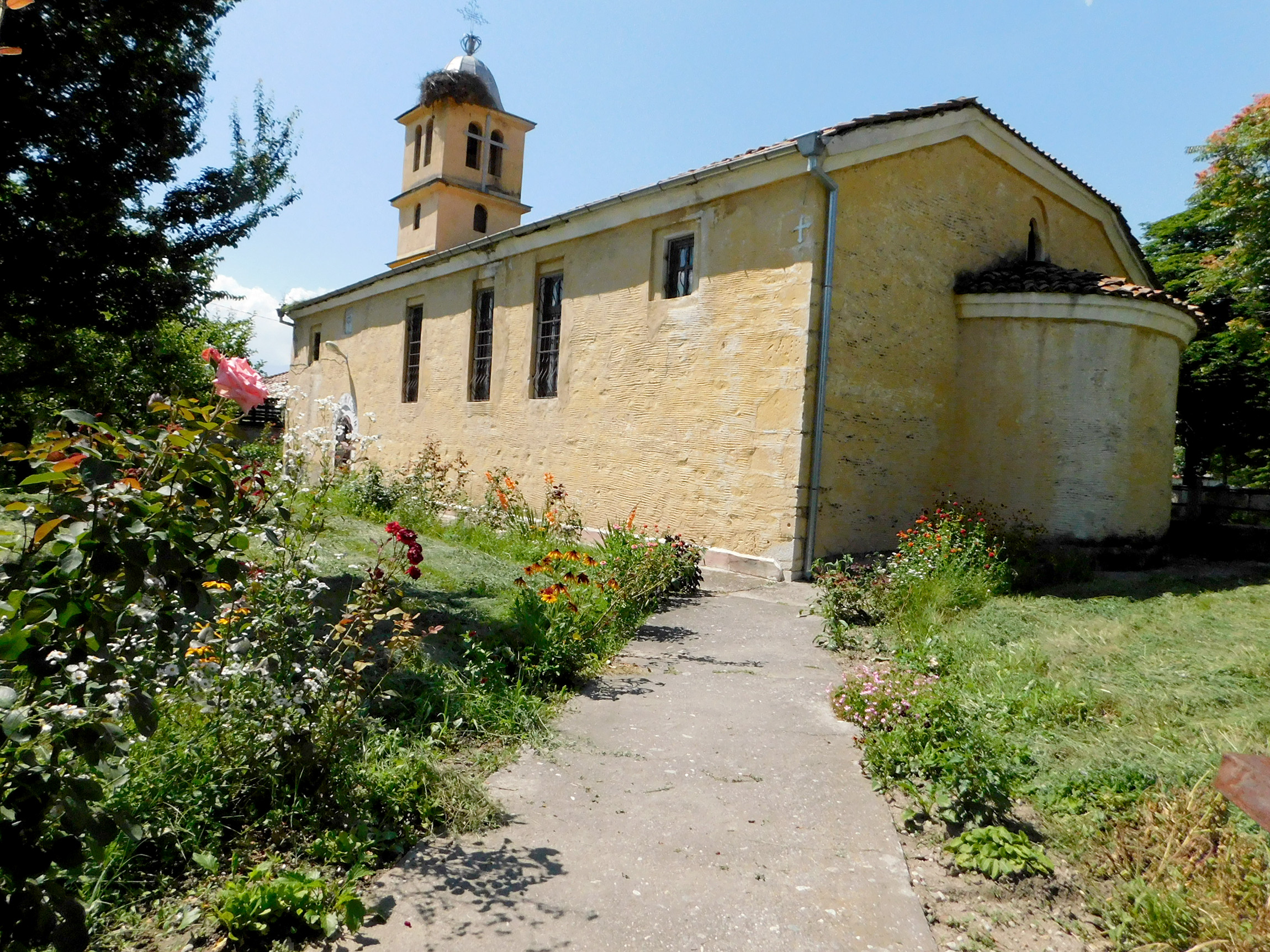
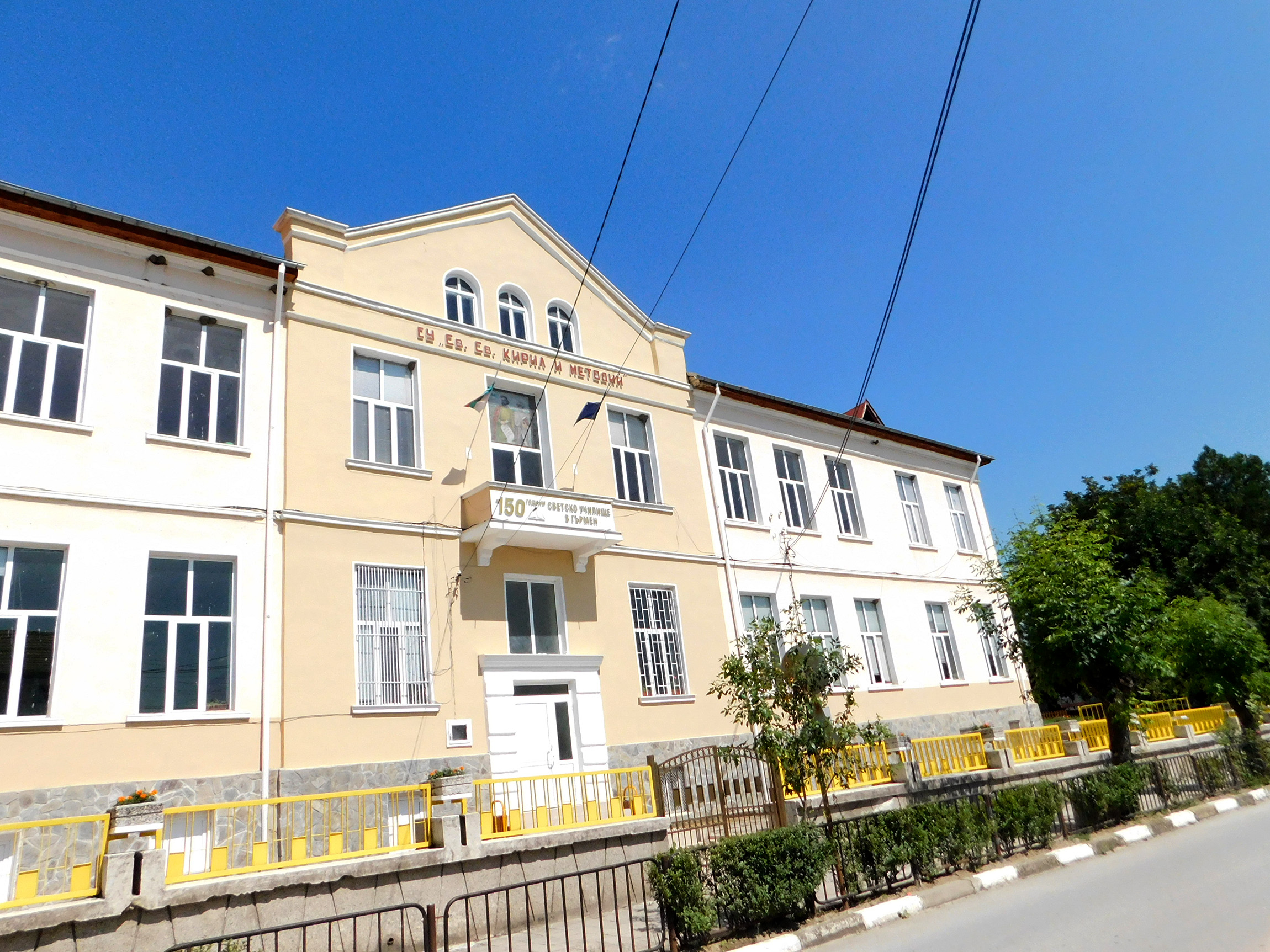
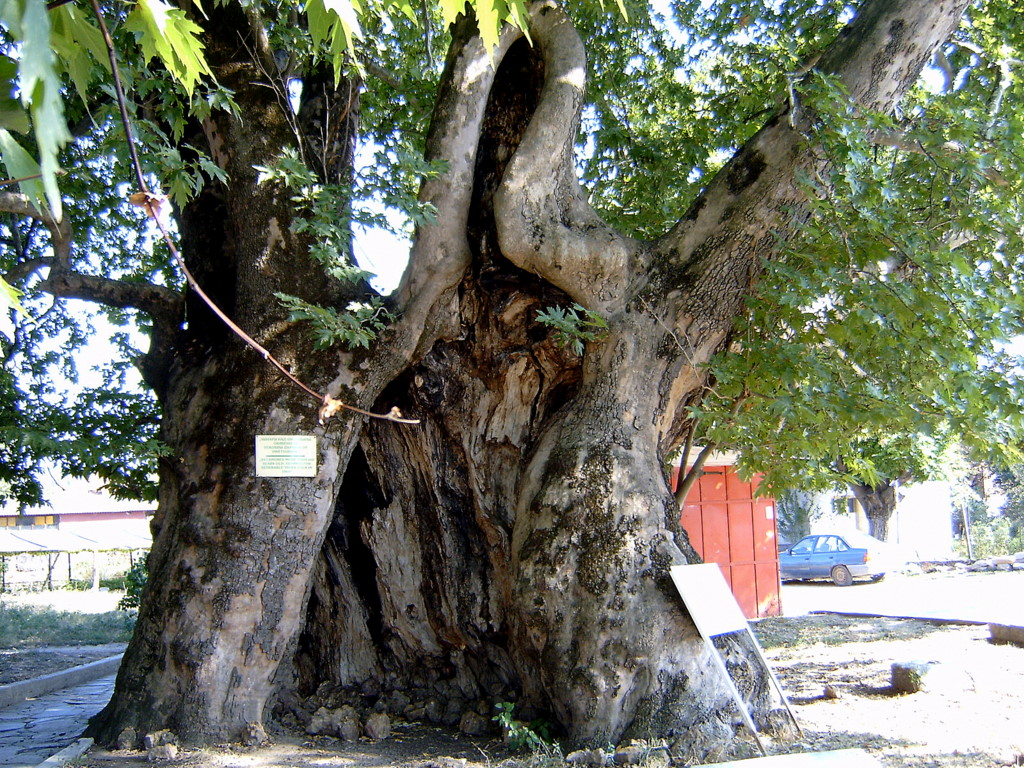
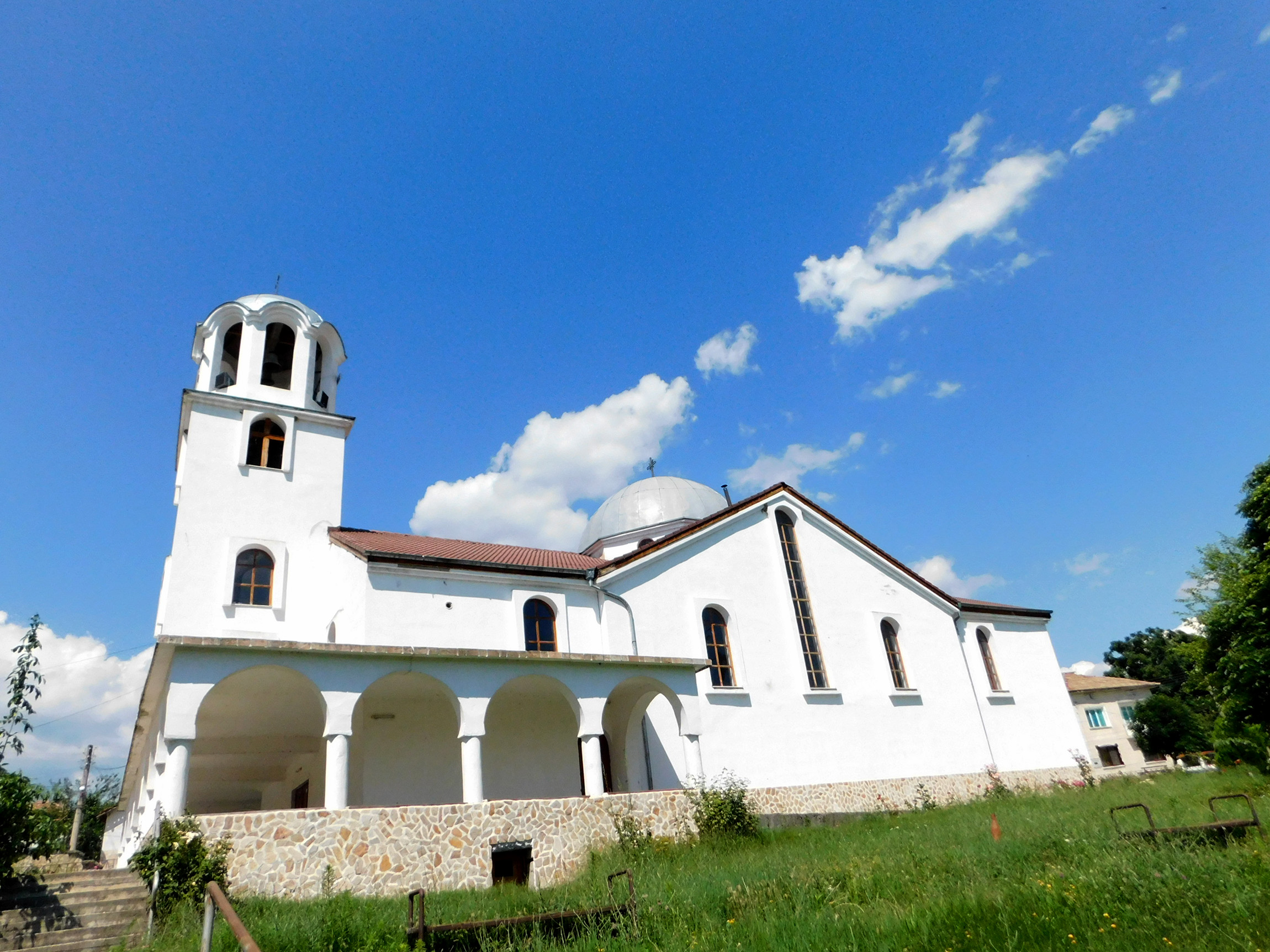
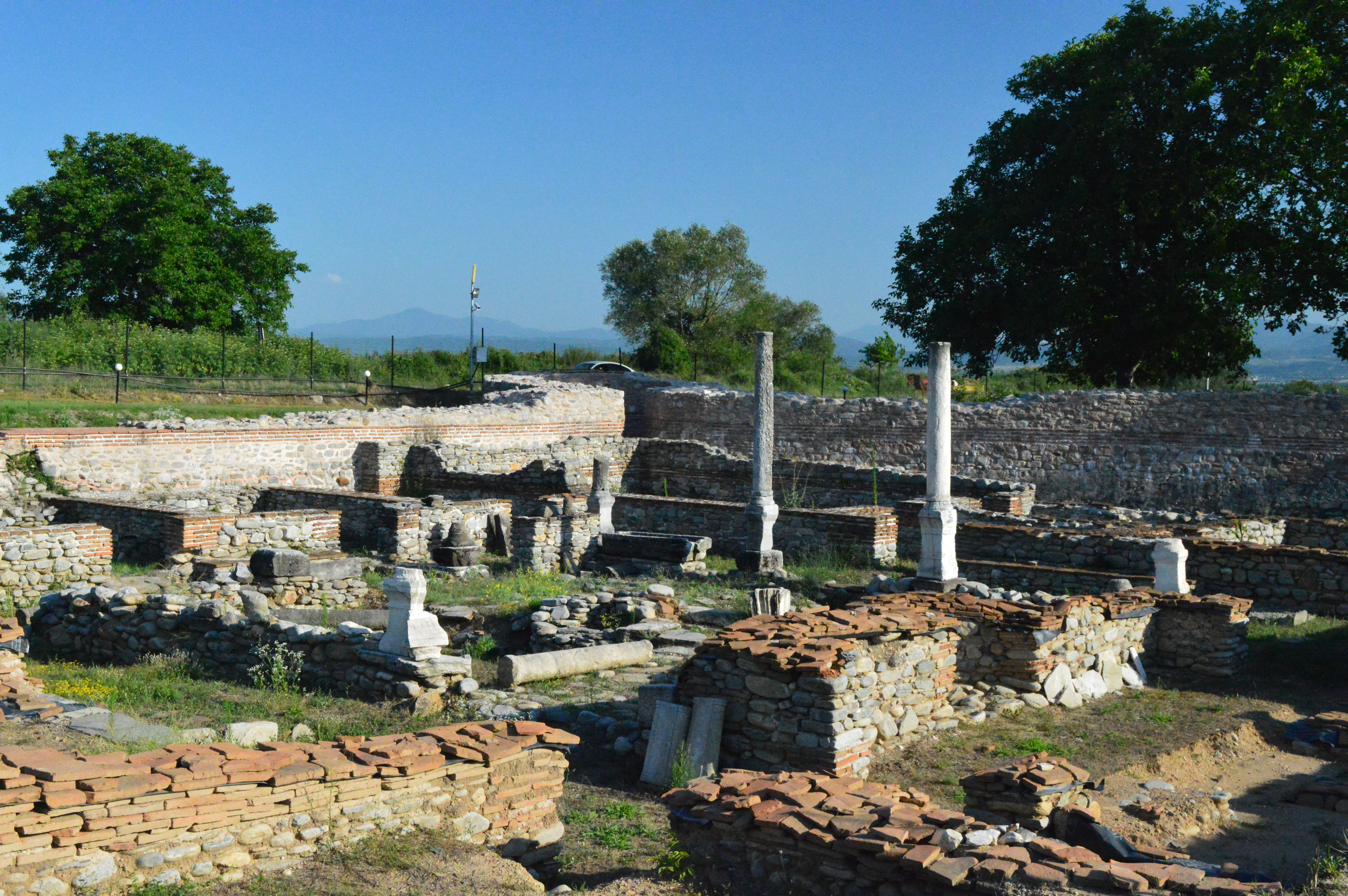

- Location of Garmen
- Coordinates: 41°36′N 23°49′E
- Country: Bulgaria
- Provinces (Oblast): Blagoevgrad

Government
  - Mayor: Feim Issa
- Elevation: 605 m (1,985 ft)

Population
  - Total: 1,931
- Time zone: UTC+2 (EET)
  - Summer (DST): UTC+3 (EEST)
- Postal Code: 2960
- Area code: 07523

Garmen (Bulgarian: Гърмен) is a village in Blagoevgrad Province in Bulgaria and is the seat of Garmen Municipality. It is located in southwestern Bulgaria in the Western Rhodope Mountains in the Chech region 75 kilometers southeast of Blagoevgrad and 127 kilometers southeast of Sofia.

== History ==
Around 146 AD, after a series of conflicts between Roman troops and Thracians, the region surrounding Gotse Delchev came under Roman control. In 106 AD, Emperor Trajan established the city of Nicopolis ad Nestum to commemorate the conquest. Although the town was destroyed by the Slavs at the end of the 6th century, the Smolyani tribe later settled in the area. The Slavs contributed to the local economy as farmers and herdsmen, cultivating crops like millet, wheat, flax, hemp, and various legumes, and raising birds, cattle, sheep, and goats.

During the Ottoman period, Garmen was frequently mentioned in Ottoman records, and a Turkish grange was constructed on the site of Nicopolis ad Nestum. Up until the 19th century, the municipality primarily functioned as a farming region, with some residents working as builders in the interior and the Aegean region. The Bulgarian Renaissance saw the establishment of the first schools and churches in the area. Notably, Garmen’s church, dedicated to St. George and built in 1898 on the foundations of an older structure, stands as a significant cultural monument of national importance.

During the Russo-Turkish War (1877–1878) and the Balkan Wars (1912–1913), the population of the municipality joined volunteer troops to fight. In 1901, a volunteer militia was formed by Stoyko Pashkulev. The area was liberated from Ottoman rule in 1912.

== Climate ==
The municipality experiences a Mediterranean climate tempered by its high altitude. It enjoys one of the warmest climates in the country, situated between two climate zones: temperate continental and transitional Mediterranean. Annual precipitation typically ranges from 620 to 780 mm, distributed relatively evenly across all four seasons. Air humidity varies between 60% and 75% throughout the year. Snow cover usually lasts for 70 to 100 days per year.

== Health care and education ==
One general practitioner is working in Garmen, and the nearest hospital is in Gotse Delchev. Garmen has one high school, St. Kiril and Metodiy Secondary School, which offers grades I through XII, as well as a kindergarten. Additionally, there is a community center that includes a public library and various schools for music and dance.

== Attractions ==
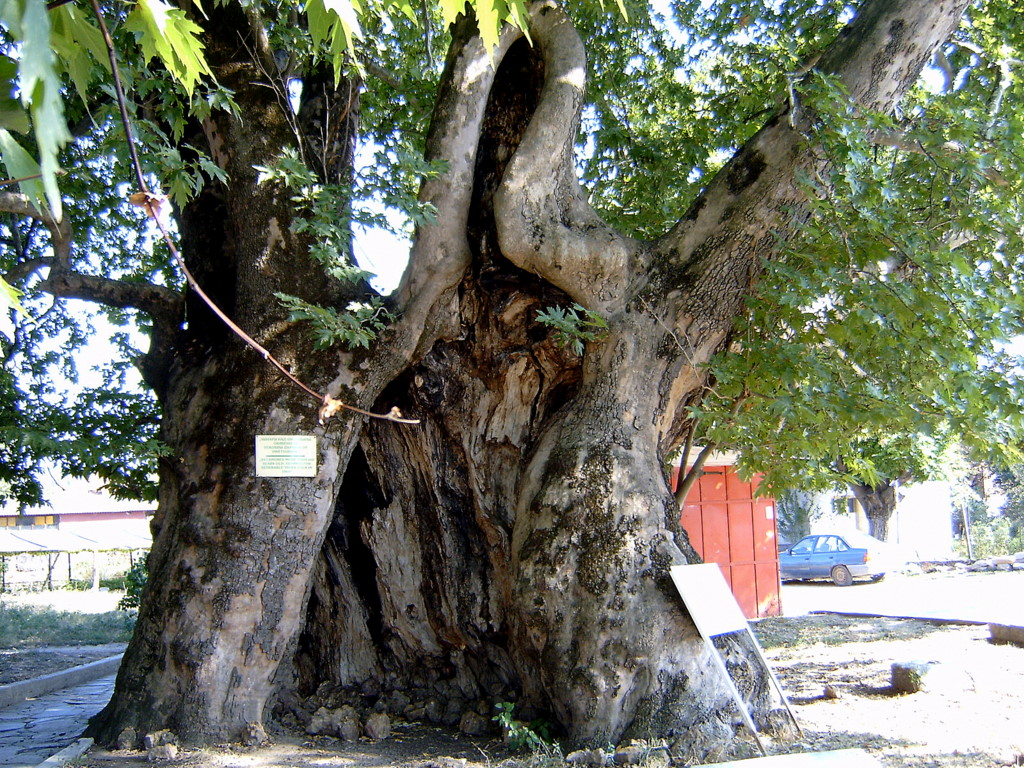

The Garmen municipality includes the remains of the ancient town of Nikopolis ad Nestum, which was founded in 106 AD by the Roman emperor Trajan to commemorate his victory over the Dacian tribe. The name means 'The City of Victory near Mesta.' This site is considered one of the most significant settlements linking the Aegean coast with the Thracian Valley. The village of Garmen is also home to an ancient plane tree, which was named Bulgaria's Tree of the Year in 2011 and placed second in the European Tree of the Year contest that same year. Additionally, there is a private villa offering accommodations for small groups

== Honour ==
Garmen Point on Smith Island, South Shetland Islands is named after Garmen.
