= Ridge =

Long, narrow, elevated landform

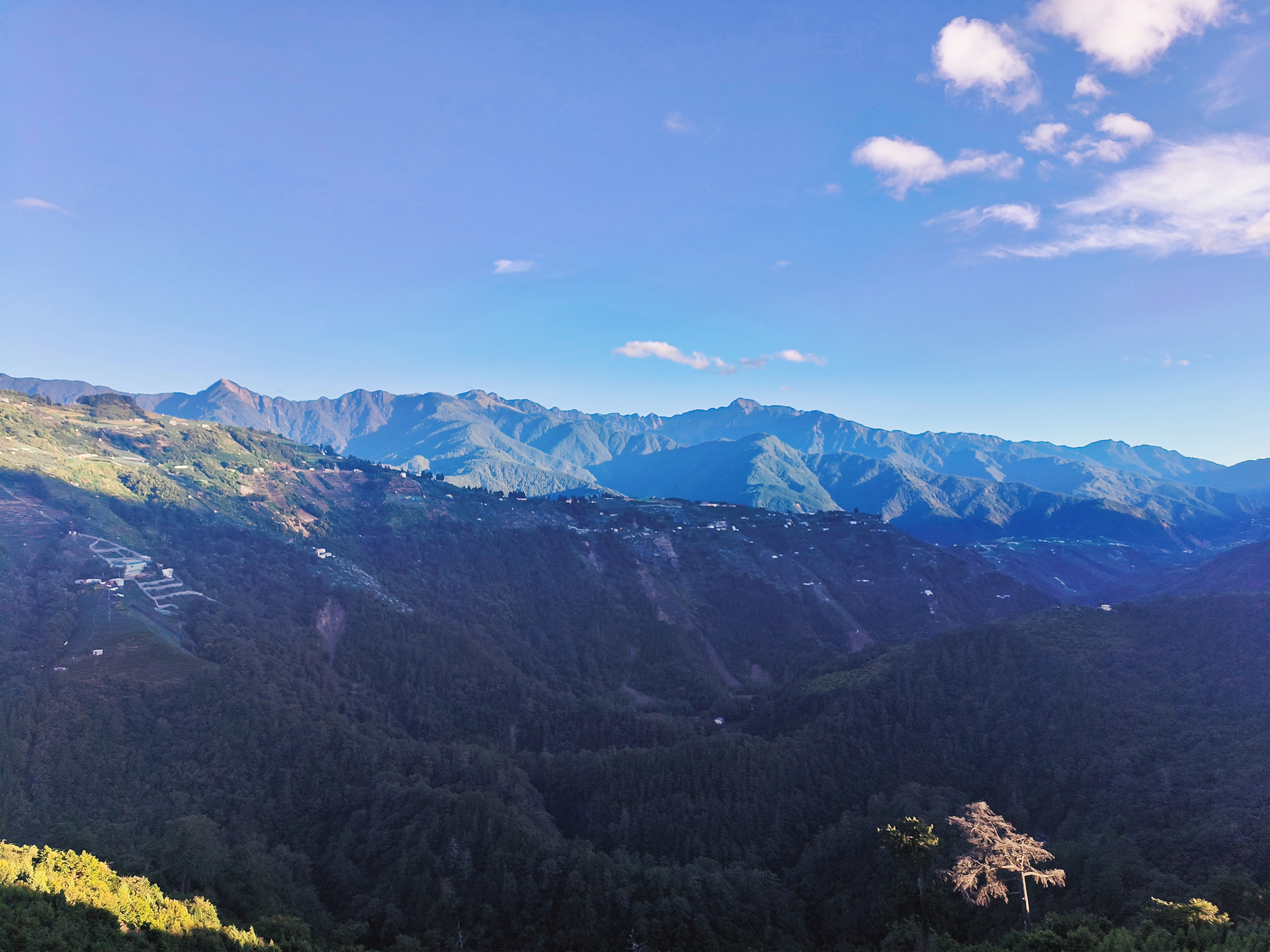
The southern ridge of the Mt Sylvia Range, a ridge composed of several peaks, viewed from the Lishan area of Taiwan

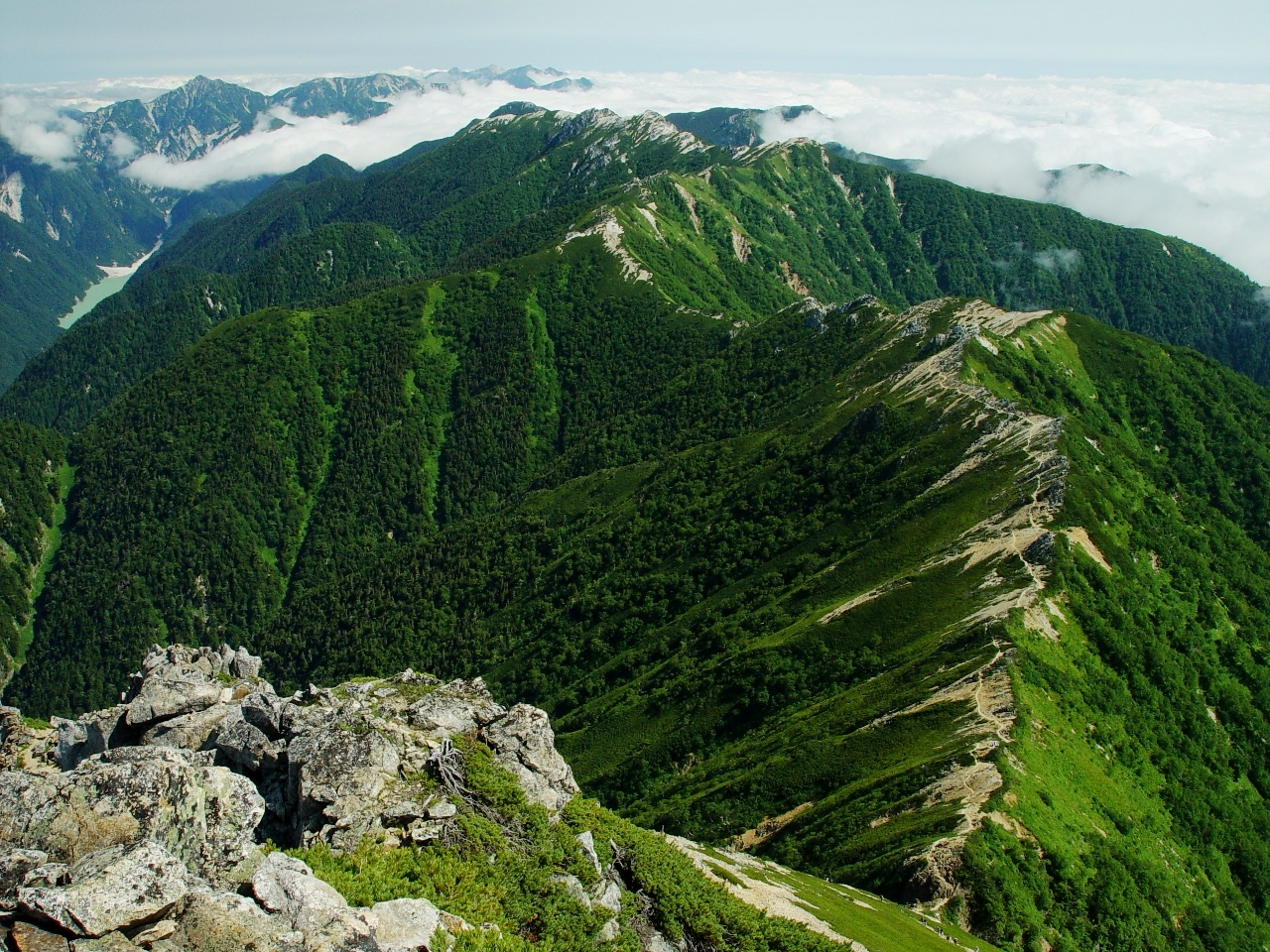
A mountain ridge from Mount Otensho to Mount Tsubakuro in Japan

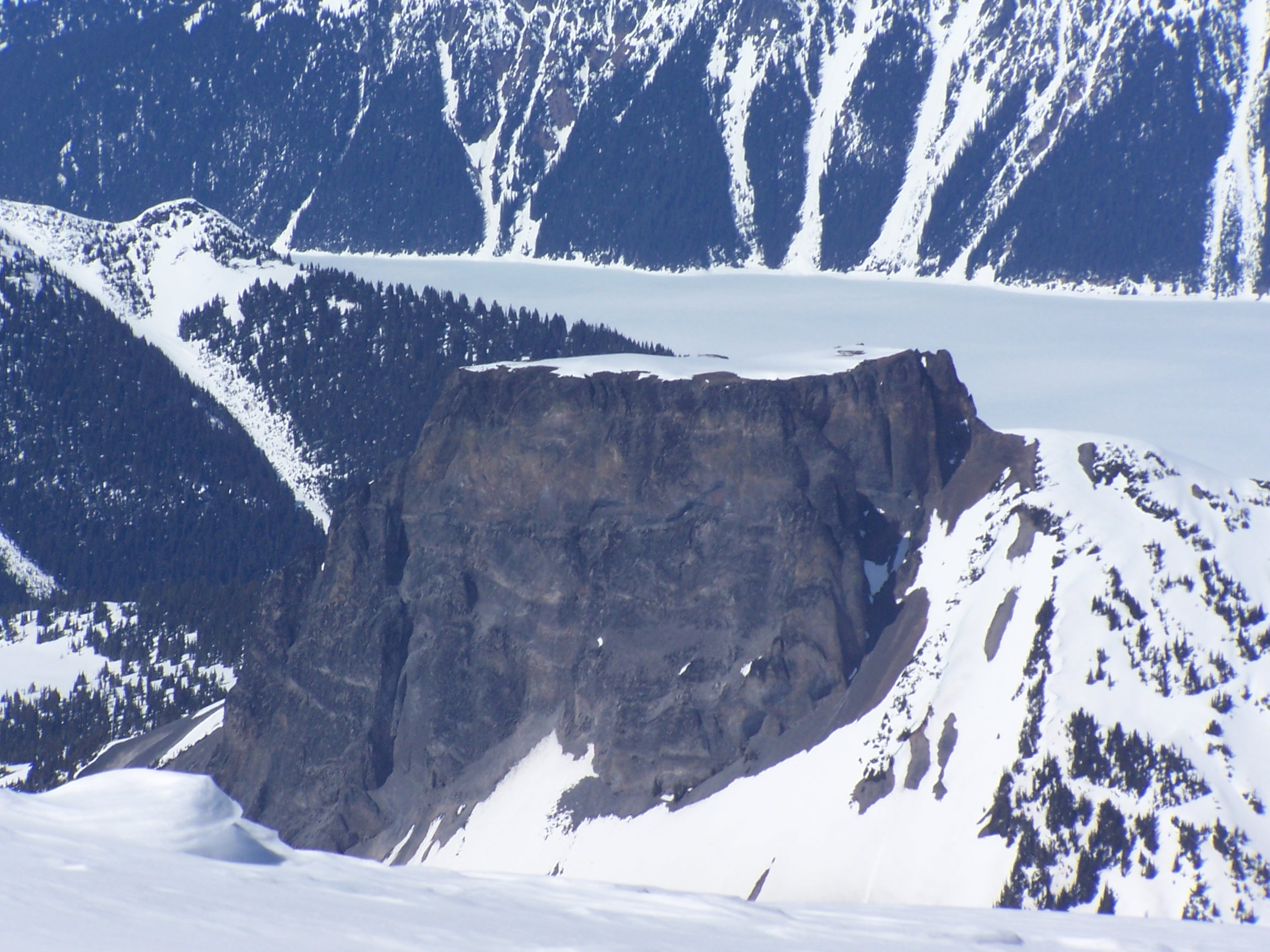
The edges of tuyas can form ridges.

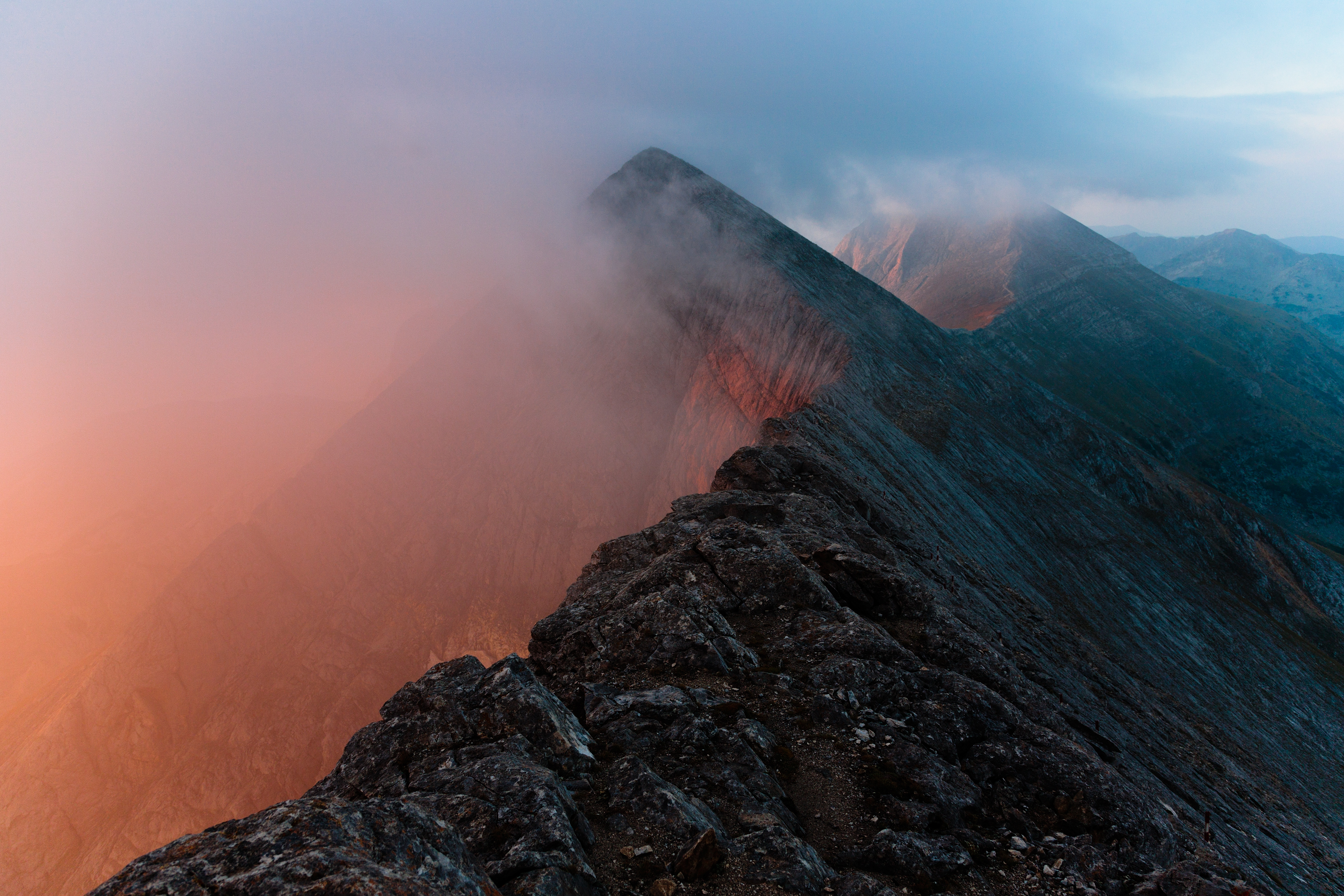
Pirin Mountain main ridge – view from Koncheto knife-edge ridge towards the pyramidal peaks Vihren and Kutelo

A ridge is a long, narrow, elevated geomorphologic landform, structural feature, or a combination of both separated from the surrounding terrain by steep sides. The sides of a ridge slope away from a narrow top, the crest or ridgecrest, with the terrain dropping down on either side. The crest, if narrow, is also called a ridgeline. Limitations on the dimensions of a ridge are lacking. Its height above the surrounding terrain can vary from less than a meter to hundreds of meters. A ridge can be either depositional, erosional, tectonic, or a combination of these in origin and can consist of either bedrock, loose sediment, lava, or ice depending on its origin. A ridge can occur as either an isolated, independent feature or part of a larger geomorphological and/or structural feature. Frequently, a ridge can be further subdivided into smaller geomorphic or structural elements.

== Classification ==
As in the case of landforms in general, there is a lack of any commonly agreed classification or typology of ridges. They can be defined and classified on the basis of a variety of factors including either genesis, morphology, composition, statistical analysis of remote sensing data, or some combinations of these factors.

An example of ridge classification is that of Schoeneberger and Wysocki, which provides a relatively simple and straightforward system that is used by the USA National Cooperative Soil Survey Program to classify ridges and other landforms. This system uses the dominant geomorphic process or setting to classify different groups of landforms into two major groups, Geomorphic Environments and Other Groupings with a total of 16 subgroups. The groups and their subgroups are not mutually exclusive; landforms, including ridges, can belong to multiple subgroups. In this classification, ridges are found in the Aeolian, Coastal Marine and Estuarine, Lacustrine, Glacial, Volcanic and Hydrothermal, Tectonic and Structural, Slope, and Erosional subgroups.

=== Aeolian ridge ===
Aeolian dune ridge
An aeolian dune ridge is a ridge of sand piled up by the wind. A sand dune can be either a hill or ridge of sand piled up by the wind. A single sand dune can range in length from less than one meter to several tens of kilometers, their height can vary from a few tens of centimeters to 150 meters. Megadunes or draas are very large dunes, which can have smaller dunes superimposed on them.

=== Coastal ridges ===
Beach ridge
A beach ridge is a low, essentially continuous ridge of beach or beach-and-dune sediments piled up by the action of waves and currents on a shoreline beyond the present limit of storm waves and the reach of ordinary tides. They occur singly or as one of a series of ridges that are roughly parallel to the shoreline.

=== Erosional ridges ===
Dendritic ridge
In typical dissected plateau terrain, the stream drainage valleys will leave intervening ridges. These are by far the most common ridges. These ridges usually represent slightly more erosion resistant rock, but not always – they often remain because there were more joints where the valleys formed or other chance occurrences. This type of ridge is generally somewhat random in orientation, often changing direction frequently, often with knobs at intervals on the ridge top.

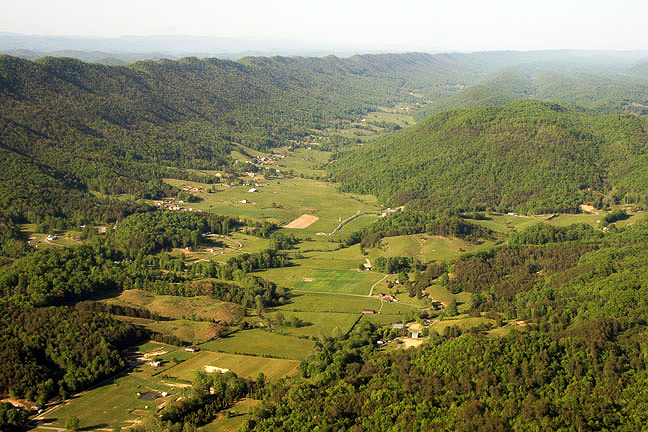
A strike ridge within the Appalachian Mountains

Strike ridge
A strike ridge is an asymmetric ridge created by the differential erosion of a hard, erosion-resistant, dipping layer of rock sandwiched between layers of weaker, more easily eroded rock. A strike ridge has a distinctly gentler sloping side (dip slope), that roughly parallels the inclined layer of erosion-resistant rock. The opposite side of a strike ridge is relatively short, steep or cliff-like slope (scarp slope) that cuts across the tilted layers of rocks. In foldbelts such as the Ridge-and-Valley Appalachians, they form series of long, parallel, straight to arcuate ridges. Strike ridges are subdivided into cuestas, flatirons, homoclinal ridges, and hogbacks.

Reef
A term applied by early explorers and settlers in the western United States to ridges that formed a rocky barrier to land travel, by analogy with ocean reefs as barriers to sea travel. Examples include Capitol Reef National Park and the San Rafael Reef. The usage may have originated with sailors during the Australian gold rushes to describe the gold-bearing ridges of Bendigo, Australia.

=== Glacial ridges ===
Moraines and eskers
Glacial activity may leave ridges in the form of moraines and eskers. An arête is a thin ridge of rock that is formed by glacial erosion.

Pressure ridge (ice)
An ice pressure ridge is a ridge of deformed ice along the boundaries of individual ice floes when the ice floes on a lake or ocean collide and compress their edges. The average height of a sea ice pressure ridge is between 5 and 30 meters.

=== Tectonic and Structural ridges ===
Oceanic spreading ridge
In tectonic spreading zones around the world, such as at the Mid-Atlantic Ridge, the volcanic activity forms new land between tectonic boundaries creating volcanic ridges at the spreading zone. Isostatic settling and erosion gradually reduces the elevations moving away from the zone.

Impact Crater ridge
Large asteroid strikes typically form large impact craters bordered by rim(s) that are circular ridge(s).

Shutter ridge
A shutter ridge is a ridge that has moved along a fault line, blocking or diverting drainage. Typically, a shutter ridge creates a valley corresponding to the alignment of the fault that produces it.

=== Volcanic and hydrothermal ridges ===
Pressure ridge (lava)
A specific case of pressure ridge, also known as a tumulus, usually develops in lava flows, especially when slow-moving lava beneath a solidified crust wells upward. The brittle crust usually buckles to accommodate the inflating core of the flow, thus creating a central crack along the length of the tumulus.

Volcanic crater/caldera ridges
Large volcanoes often have a central crater or caldera or both, bordered by rims that form circular ridges.

Volcanic subglacial ridges
Subglacial volcanic eruptions can create volcanic ridges, known as tindars, that vary from tens of meters up to 250 meters in height. Tindars are a piles of volcanic ash that have been generated by explosive subaqueous eruptions in a glacial meltwater-filled vault or lake within a glacier or ice sheet.

== See also ==
- Arête – Narrow ridge formed by glacial erosion
- Drumlin – Elongated hill formed by glacial action
- Fall line (topography) – Mountain or hill direction
- Hill chain – Elongated line of hills
- Interlocking spur – Fluvial erosion feature
- Mountain chain – Row of high mountain summits
- Mountain range – Geographic area containing several geologically related mountains
- Tectonic uplift – Geologic uplift of Earth's surface that is attributed to plate tectonics
