= Banski Suhodol =

Peak in the Pirin mountain, south-western Bulgaria

Banski Suhodol (Бански Суходол)
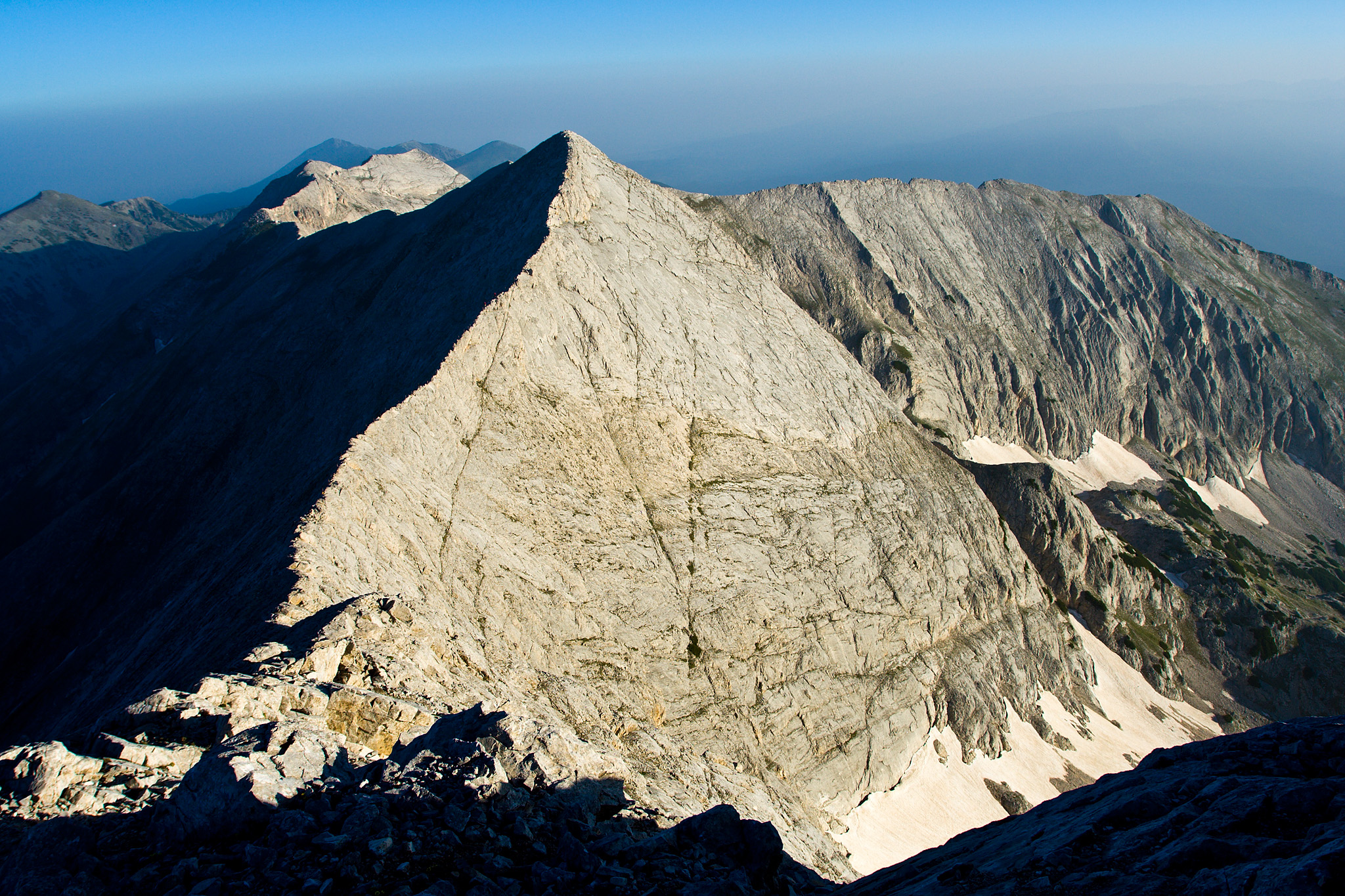
- A view of Banski Suhodol from Kutelo. To the left in the bottom is the Koncheto ridge.

Highest point
- Elevation: 2,884 m (9,462 ft)
- Coordinates: 41°47′03.4″N 23°23′27.3″E

Geography
- Location: Blagoevgrad Province, Bulgaria
- Parent range: Pirin Mountains

Banski Suhodol (Bulgarian: Бански Суходол [ˈbanski suxoˈdɔɫ]) is a peak in the Pirin mountain, south-western Bulgaria. It is located in the northern part of Pirin on the main ridge. Its height is 2,884 m which ranks it in third place in Pirin after Vihren (2,914 m) and Kutelo (2,908 m).

To the south-east of Banski Suhodol on the main ridge is located at the summit of Kutelo and the two peaks are linked by the Koncheto ridge — a dizzy karst ridge which on some places is only 70 cm wide.

On the main ridge to the north-west is situated a nameless peak from which to the north-east deviated the secondary karst ridge Koteshki Chal. From there the main ridge runs in west-northwest direction to the nearby Bayuvi Dupki peak (2,820 m).

The north-eastern slope of Banski Suhodol is a vertical 300-meter marble wall that lowers down to the cirque of the same name. There are a lot of places in the cirque where the snow remains the whole year, several karst caves have been discovered there.

The south-western slope drops down to the valley of the river Vlahina reka at 70°. Although that slope is not so steep as the north-eastern one, the displacement between the peak and the valley below is around 1,000 m and forms a dramatic view. In that direction there is a view to the main summit Vihren and the second in rank — Kutelo, the granite Hvoynati Vrah (2,635 m) and Muratov Vrah (2,669 m) as well as the secondary Sinanishki ridge with its cirques and ridges and the Vlahini Lakes with the marble peak Sinanitsa (2,516 m) in the distance.
