= Krastava, Pazardzhik Province =

Krastava Кръстава
- Village
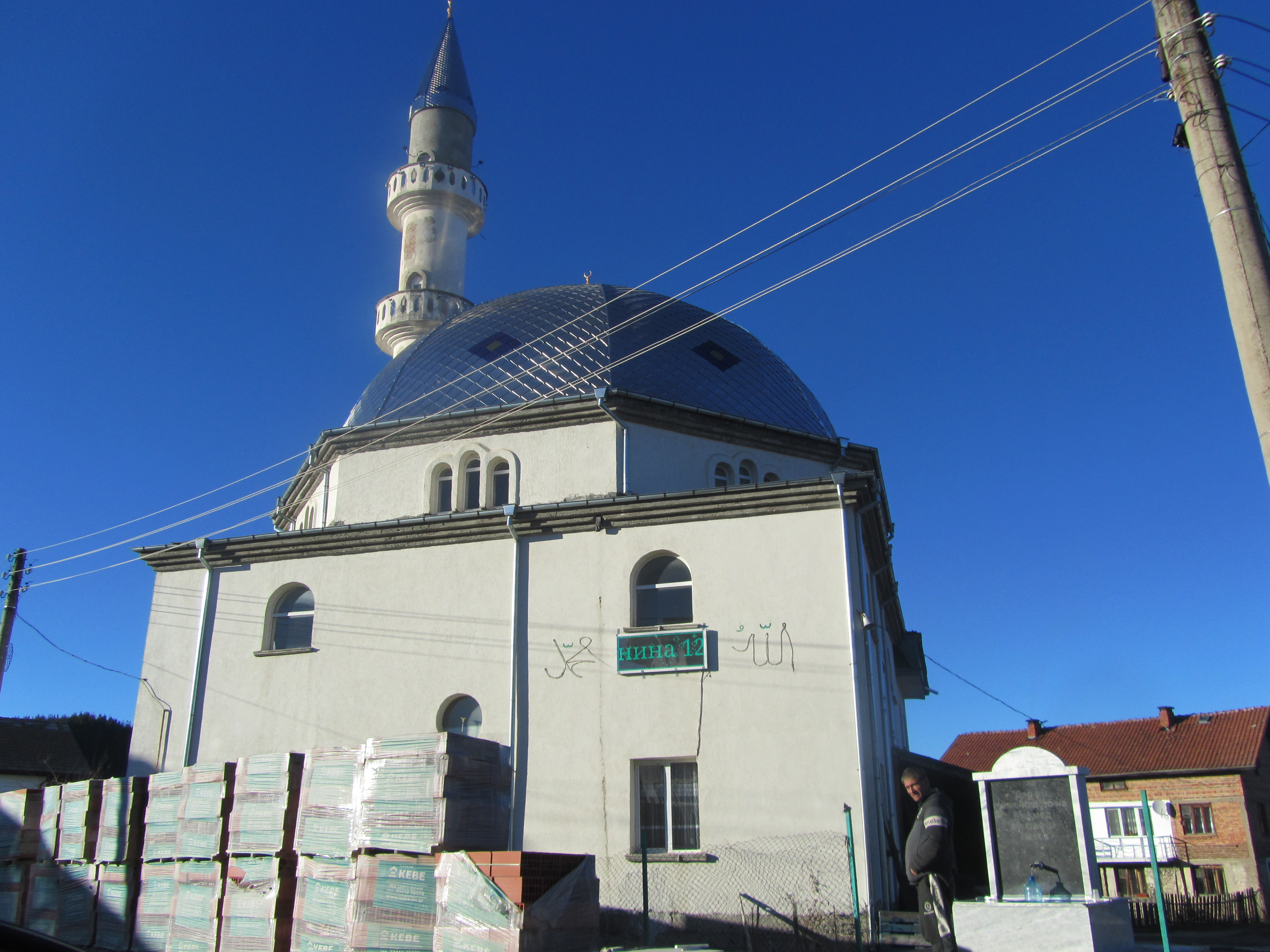

- Location within Bulgaria
- Coordinates: 41°57′35.61″N 23°49′14.8″E

Government
  - Mayor: Salih Uzunov (GERB)

Area
  - Total: 159.748 km^{2} (61.679 sq mi)

Population
  - Total: 1,034
  - Density: 6.473/km^{2} (16.76/sq mi)
- Time zone: UTC+2 (EET)
  - Summer (DST): UTC+2 (EEST)

Krastava (Bulgarian: Кръстава) is a village located in Velingrad Municipality, Pazardzhik Province, Southern Bulgaria.

The village of Krastava is located in a mountainous area, 26 km from Velingrad. It is a mountainous area composed mainly of pine and spruce forests. From the vicinity of the village three mountains can be seen - Rila, Pirin, Rhodope Mountains, as well as the peaks Musala, Vihren, Golyama Syutka and Malka Syutka.

== History ==
Krastava was established as a settlement in 1790. The first school was established in 1926. As a village, it was established on 24 October 1975. In 1978, the mahallas Goritsa (Asanova) and Krantiyte were incorporated into Krastava and had its own mayoralty in 1979.

== Religion ==
Krastava is a Pomak village.
