= Bayuvi Dupki =

Peak in the Pirin mountain range in Bulgaria

Bayuvi Dupki (Баюви дупки)
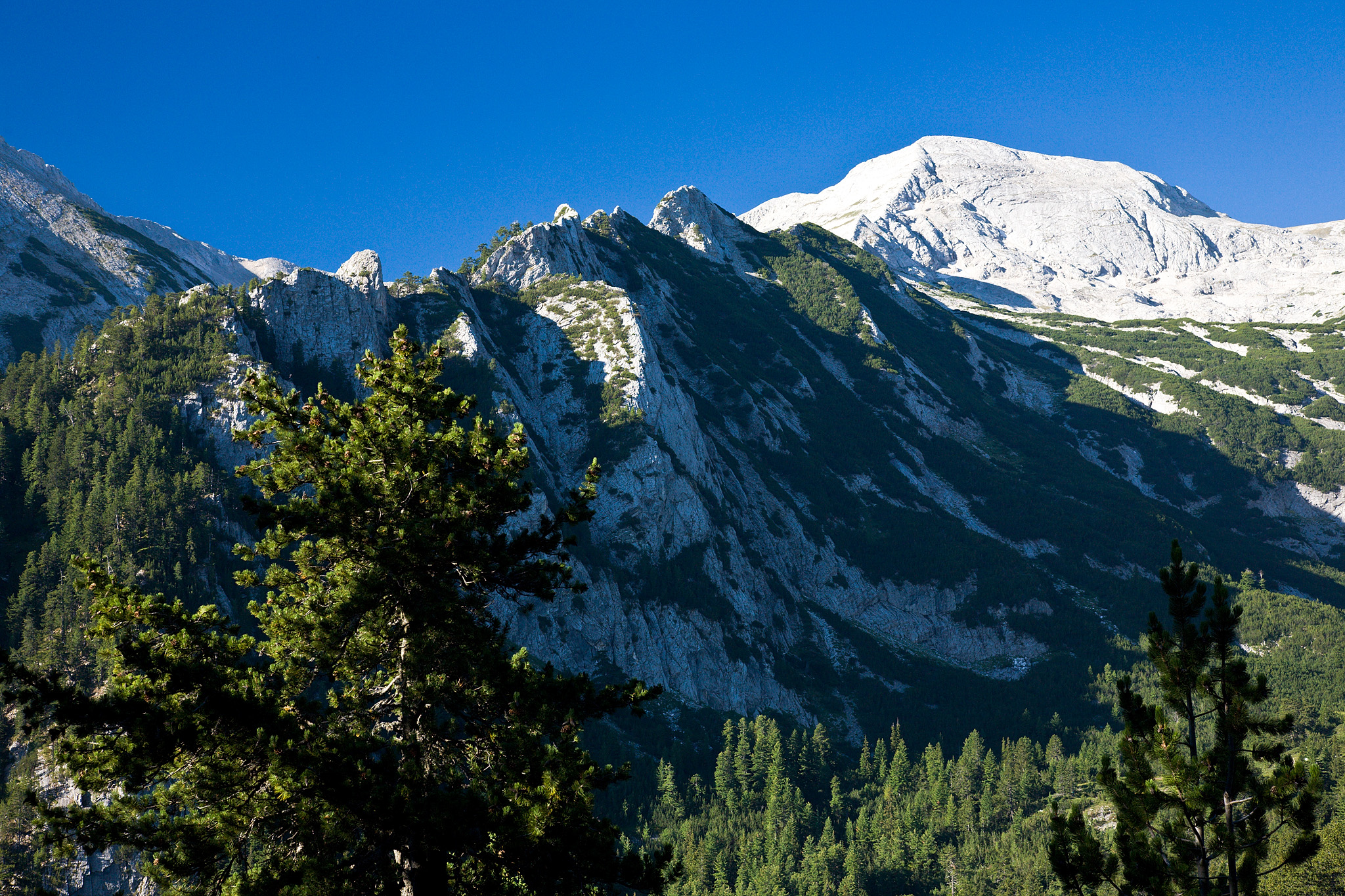
- A view to Bayuvi Dupki

Highest point
- Elevation: 2,820 m (9,250 ft)
- Coordinates: 41°47′25″N 23°22′42″E

Geography
- Location: Blagoevgrad Province, Bulgaria
- Parent range: Pirin Mountains

Bayuvi Dupki (Bulgarian: Баюви дупки [ˈbajovi ˈdupki]) is a peak in the Pirin mountain range, south-western Bulgaria. It falls within the borders of the Bayuvi Dupki–Dzhindzhiritsa reserve in Pirin National Park. It is situated on the main ridge of the range between the peaks of Banski Suhodol to the south-east and Kamenititsa to the north-west. Its height is 2,820 m. The eastern slopes descend steeply to the Bayuvi Dupki Cirque, while the western slopes face the valley of the Vlahina river. A tourist eco-path traverses the western slope. The northern face is popular with climbers. The peak is built up of karstified marbles. The summit accommodates many rare herbaceous plants, including edelweiss (Leontopodium nivale) and the only locality of Euphrasia drosocalyx in the Balkan Peninsula.

Bayuvi Dupki has three distinct peak points; the main elevation being the southern one. The rocky karst ridge Sredonosa takes its beginning at the north-eastern point. The main crest between the three points may be as narrow as 50 cm. The eastern slopes facing the homonymous cirque are vertical and inaccessible. The western slopes are heavily inclined to the valley of the Vlahina river.

At 470 m to the south-east of the summit on the main ridge is situated the highest alpine shelter in Bulgaria — Koncheto. To the north of Bayuvi Dupki is located the saddle Kamenititski Preval. There are three paths leading from Kamenititski Preval to the shelter. The most frequently used is marked in red and cuts down the steep western slopes of Bayuvi Dupki. The second one follows the main ridge. The third path cuts the northernmost point and then joins the second one. The last two paths are not marked.
