= Hvoynati Vrah =

Peak in Bulgaria

Hvoynati Vrah (Хвойнати връх)
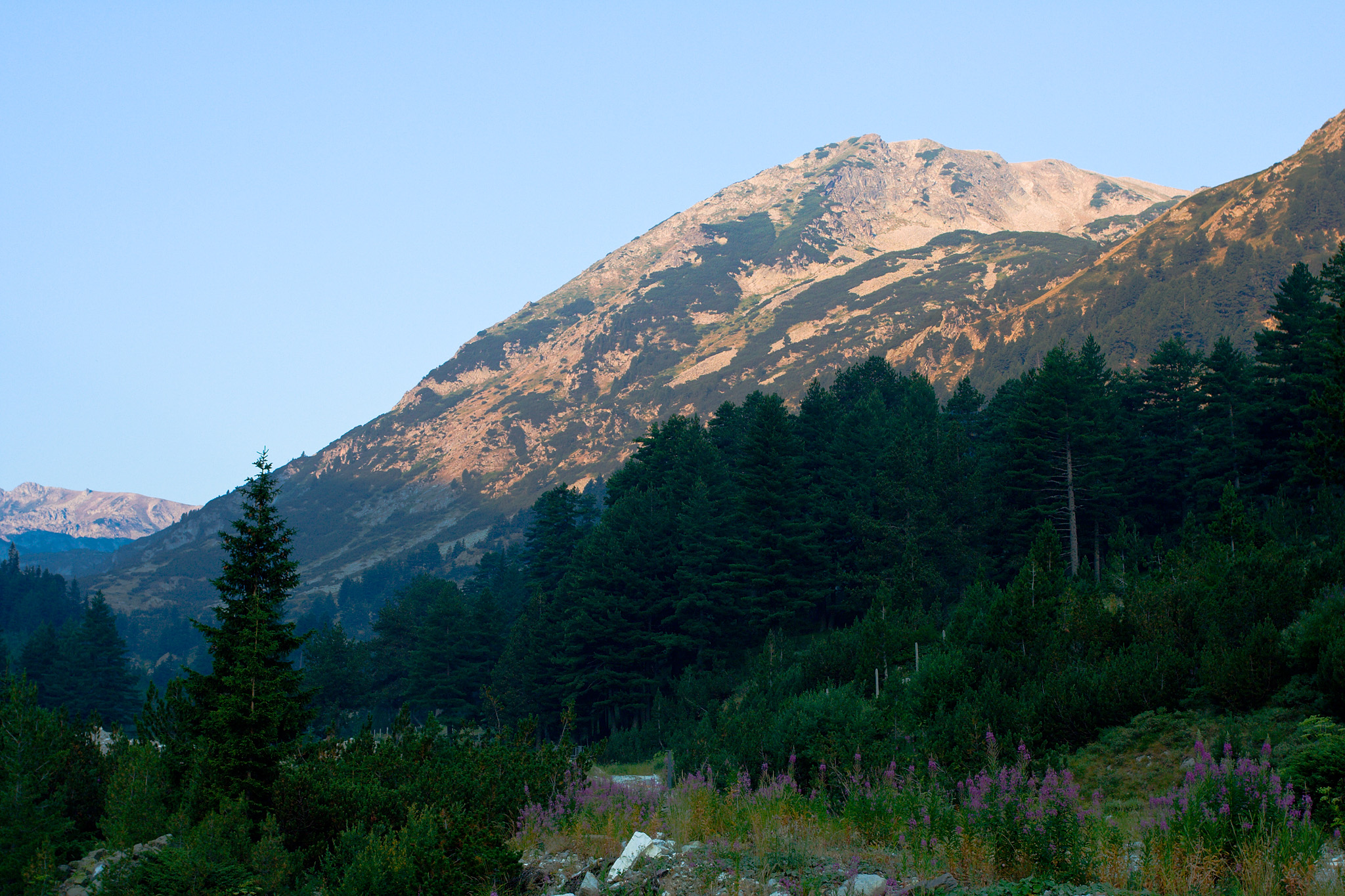

Highest point
- Elevation: 2,635 m (8,645 ft)
- Coordinates: 41°43′22.8″N 23°23′59.64″E

Geography
- Location: Blagoevgrad Province, Bulgaria
- Parent range: Pirin Mountains

Hvoynati Vrah (Bulgarian: Хвойнати връх, meaning Juniper Peak) is a 2,635 m high peak in the Pirin mountain range, south-western Bulgaria. It is situated on the main mountain ridge between the summits of Vihren (2,914 m) and Muratov Vrah (2,669 m). It is built up of granite.

Hvoynati Vrah is domed shape, with an extensive grassy cover around the top elevation. To the south, the sharp pointy saddle Vlahinski pass connects it with Muratov Vrah. This saddle separates the Vlahinski Cirque to the northwest from the Banderishki Cirque to the southeast and forms the most accessible connection between them. To the north the saddle Kabata leads to Vihren, the highest summit in the mountain range. At Kabata the granite rocks of Hvoynati Vrah give way to the marble rocks in the direction of Vihren.

The western slopes of Hvoynati vrach towards the Vlahini Lakes are steep, grassy and difficult to access. To the east, the slopes are covered with dwarf mountain pine; in places they are rocky and furrowed with deep gullies that reach all the way to the bed of the river Banderitsa. To the northeast towards Kabata, the slopes are heavily eroded, in places with rock blockages, screes and rockfalls. In winter, there is a significant risk of avalanches along the eastern and northeastern slopes.

There are no marked tourist trails through Hvoynati Vrah. However, the peak is easily accessible from the Kabata or Vlachinski pass by paths marked with stone cairns.
