= Golemiya Kazan =

Mountain in Bulgaria

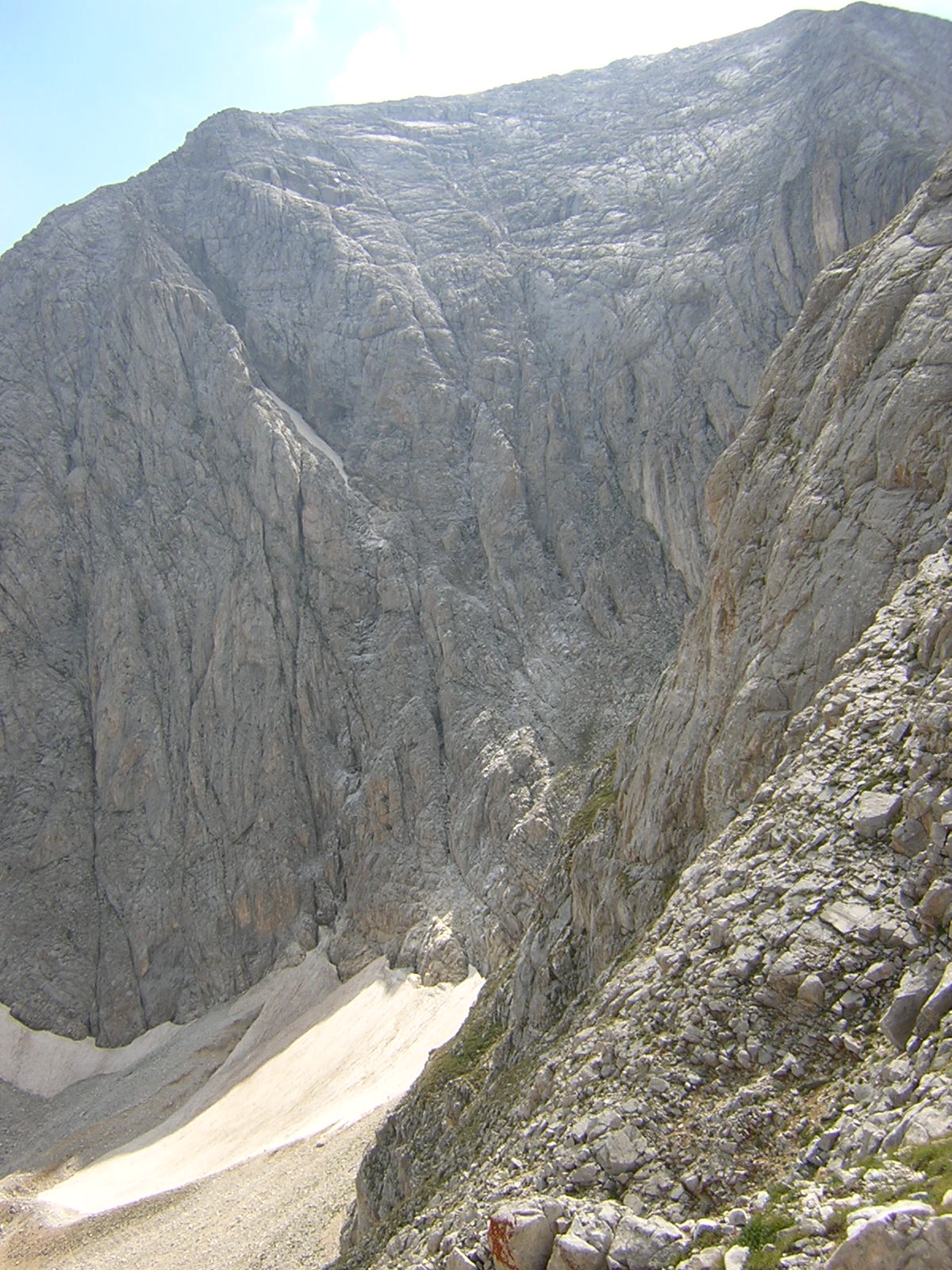
Vihren seen from Kazanite

Golemiya Kazan (Bulgarian: Големия казан) is one of the two cirques that form an area called Kazanite (the Cauldrons), situated in Bulgaria's Pirin mountain range. Kazanite are located below the two highest summits Vihren (2,914 m) to the south and Kutelo (2,908 m) to the north. It is composed of two cirques, Malkiya Kazan (The Small Cauldron), which is the lower one (2,200 m) and is grassy, and Golemiya Kazan (The Big Cauldron), situated at 2,400 m and with stony slopes. The size of Golemiya Kazan is 1,200 m by 1,100 m. They were named like that because there is often fog rising from the cirques. Due to the karst in the region there are no lakes or streams in Kazanite. A 450 m-high face of Vihren begins from Golemiya Kazan and at its foot a small glacier called Snezhnika is located, whose size is 80x90 m in summer, with a latitude of 41°46′09″ N it is the southernmost glacial mass in Europe. Chamois are abundant in this area.
