= Kutelo =

Sunmit in Bulgaria

Kutelo (Кутело)
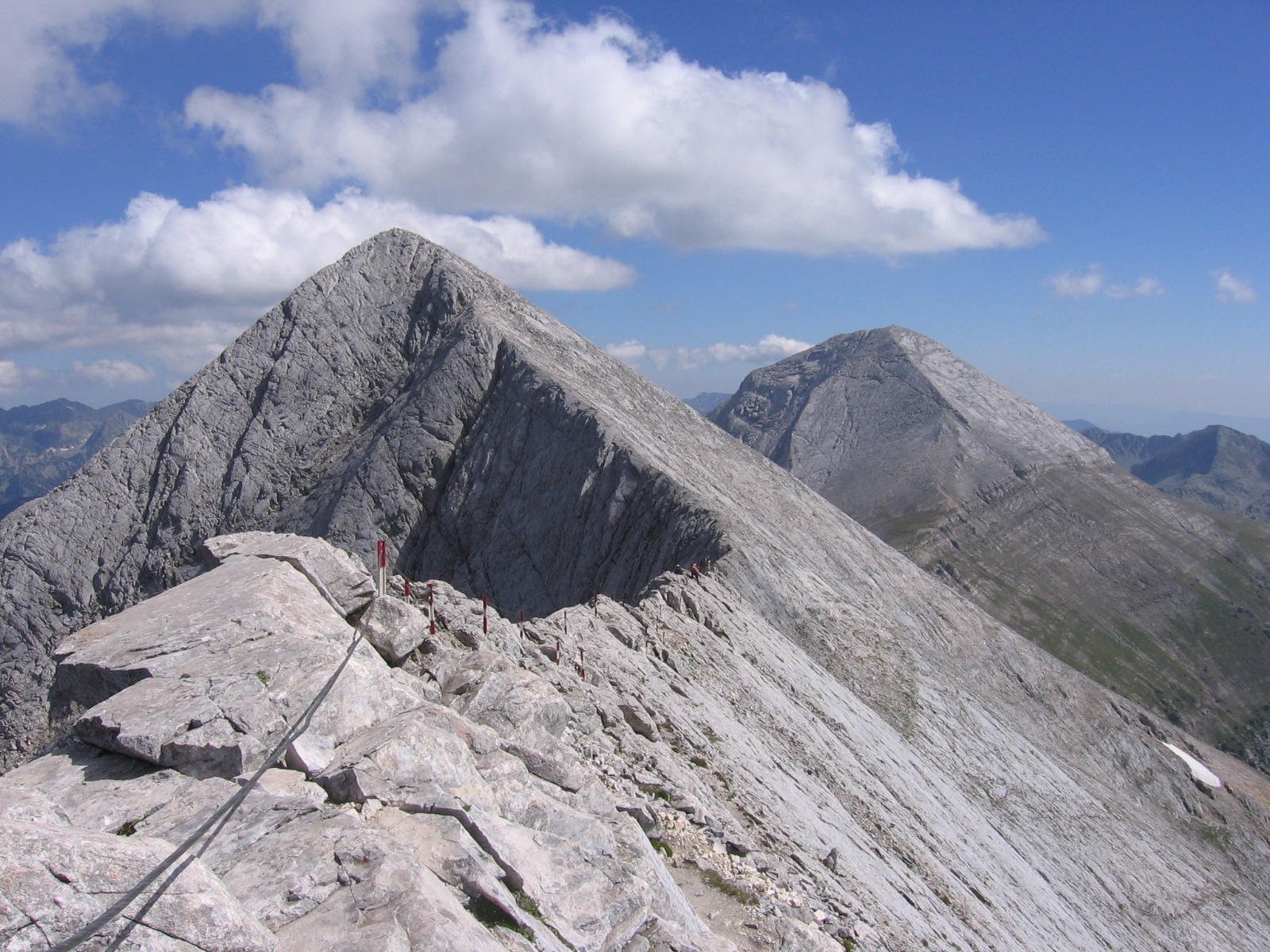
- Kutelo (in the front) and Vihren (back) viewed from Koncheto.

Highest point
- Elevation: 2,908
- Coordinates: 41°46′36.7″N 23°24′00.1″E

Geography
- Location: Blagoevgrad Province, Bulgaria
- Parent range: Pirin Mountains

Climbing
- Easiest route: From Bunderitsa hut, via Premkata saddle

Kutelo (Bulgarian: Кутело [ˈkutɛɫo]) is a summit in the Pirin mountain range, southwestern Bulgaria. With a height of 2,908 m, it is the second highest peak in Pirin after Vihren (2,914 m), and the third one in Bulgaria, behind Musala (2,925 m) in Rila and Vihren. Kutelo is a double peak with a small saddle between the two parts, the lower being only one meter shorter than the higher one, at 2,907 m. Seen from the town of Bansko, it appears higher than Vihren.

Like Vihren, which towers to the south, Kutelo is built up of marble but its slopes though sheer are not so rocky and it is not very difficult to climb. On the north-eastern slopes there are alpine climbing tracks of category II "b". The Premkata saddle is situated to the south and leads to Vihren while to the north is the narrow karst edge Koncheto which links Kutelo to the summit of Banski Suhodol. There are no marked tracks to the summit of Kutelo, but on the slanting western slope among the rocks is nestled the track between the Vihren refuge and Yavorov refuge. This track also leads along Koncheto. In the homonymous waterless cirque to the north-east there are snow-drifts all the year. To the south-east is the cirque Golemiya Kazan with Europe's southernmost glacier, Snezhnika. Pirin's second glacierlet, Banski Suhodol Glacier, is situated below the northern face of Kutelo.

Kutelo is home to chamois and on its slopes grow edelweiss (Leontopodium nivale) and a number of other rare herbaceous plants.
