= Koncheto =

Knife-edge ridge in the Pirin Mountains in Bulgaria

Coordinates: 41.782152°N 23.393113°E

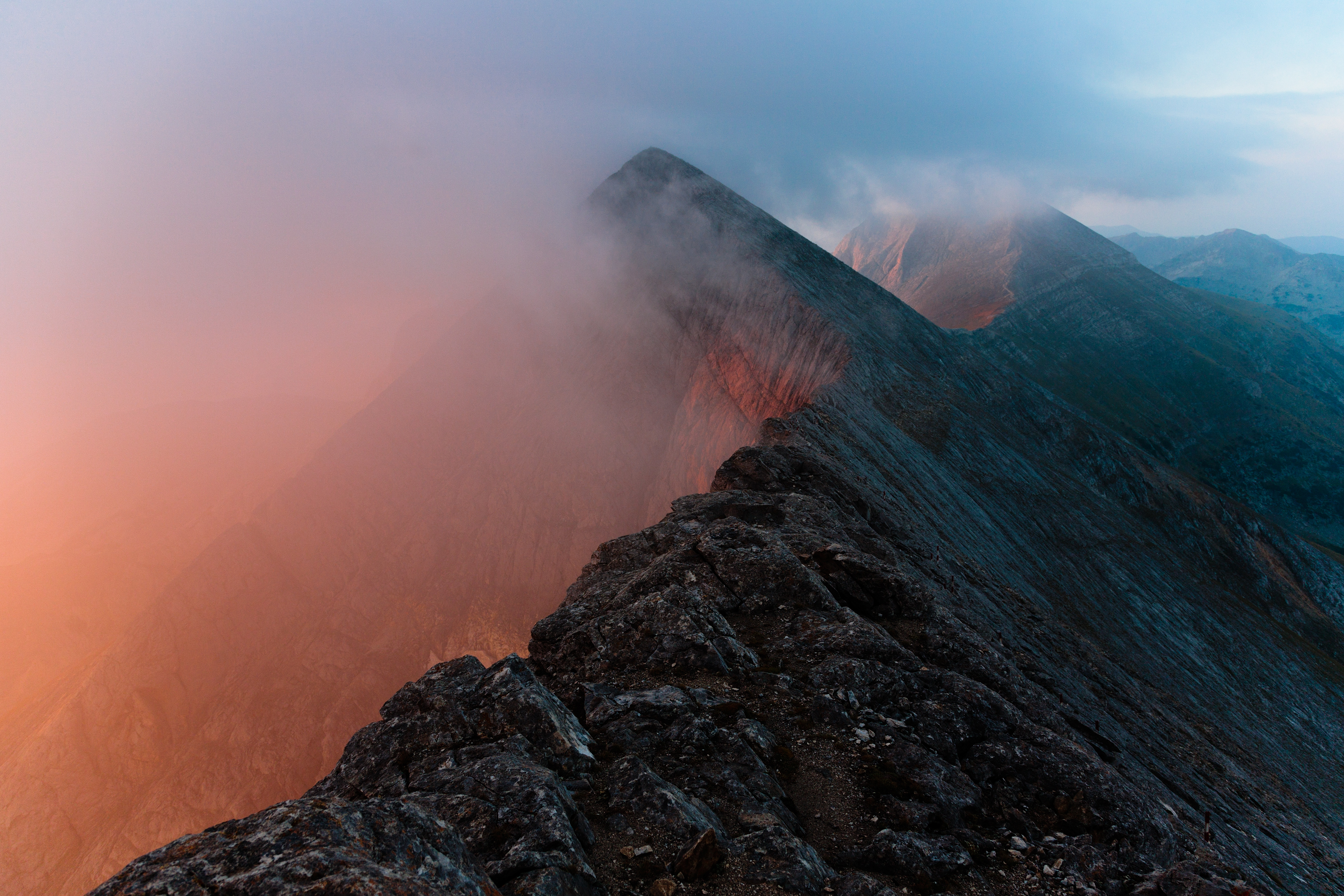
View from Koncheto towards the southeast, with the peaks Kutelo and Vihren

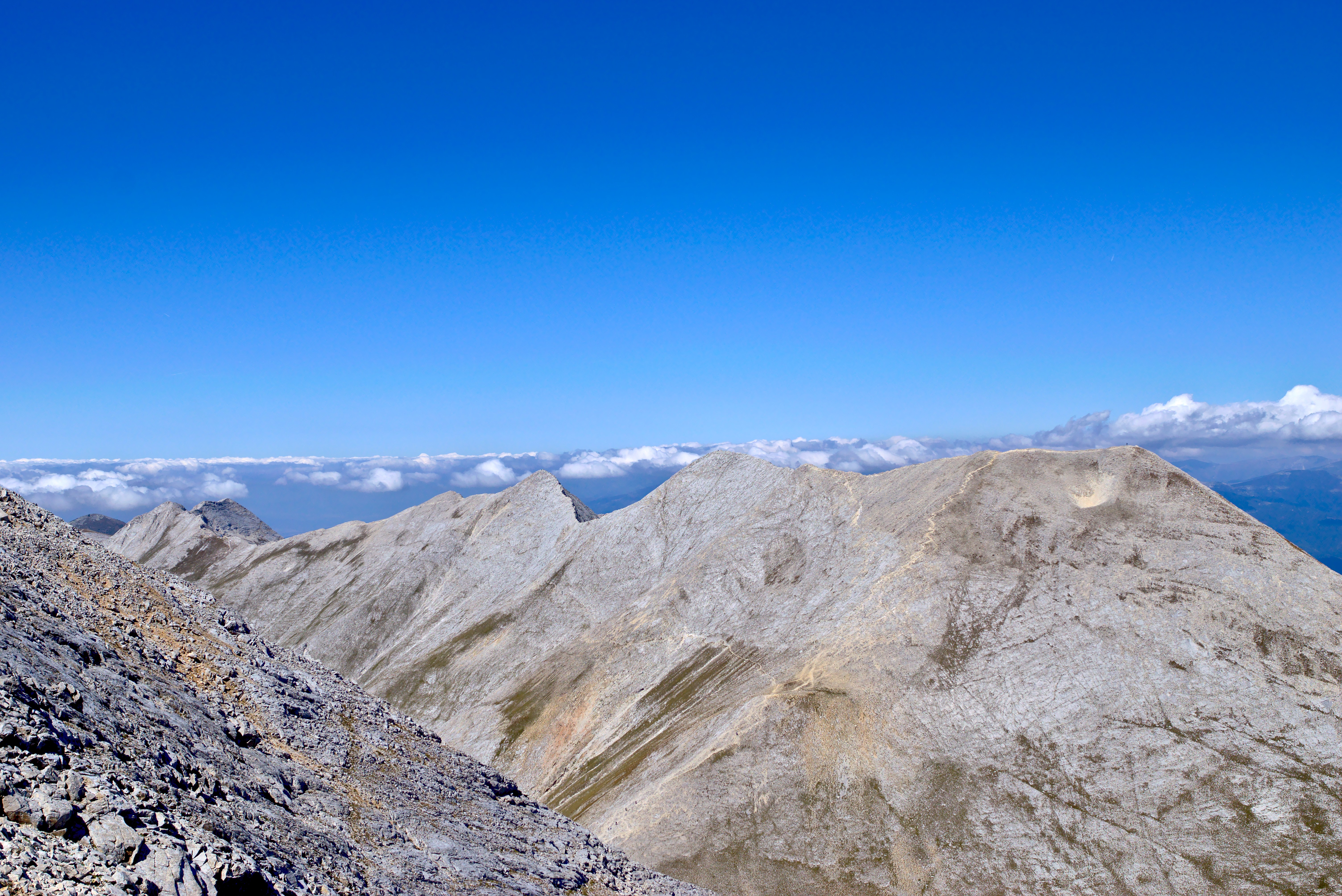
The Koncheto ridge as seen from peak Vihren

Koncheto (Bulgarian: Кончето [ˈkɔnt͡ʃɛto], lit. 'foal') is a name given to a knife-edge ridge in the Pirin Mountains in Bulgaria, at an elevation of approximately 2,810 metres, between the peaks Banski Suhodol (2,884 meters) and Kutelo (2,908 metres). There are steep slopes on either side: the northwestern side is almost vertical and 300–400 metres deep, while the southwestern side is less steep (approximately 30 degrees) but deeper (800 metres). There is a steel cable stretched along the top of the ridge to help hikers across. It is said that some less experienced hikers go through Koncheto by saddling the ridge edge like a horse and slowly advancing, hence its name.
