= Vlahini Lakes =

Group of mountain lakes in Bulgaria

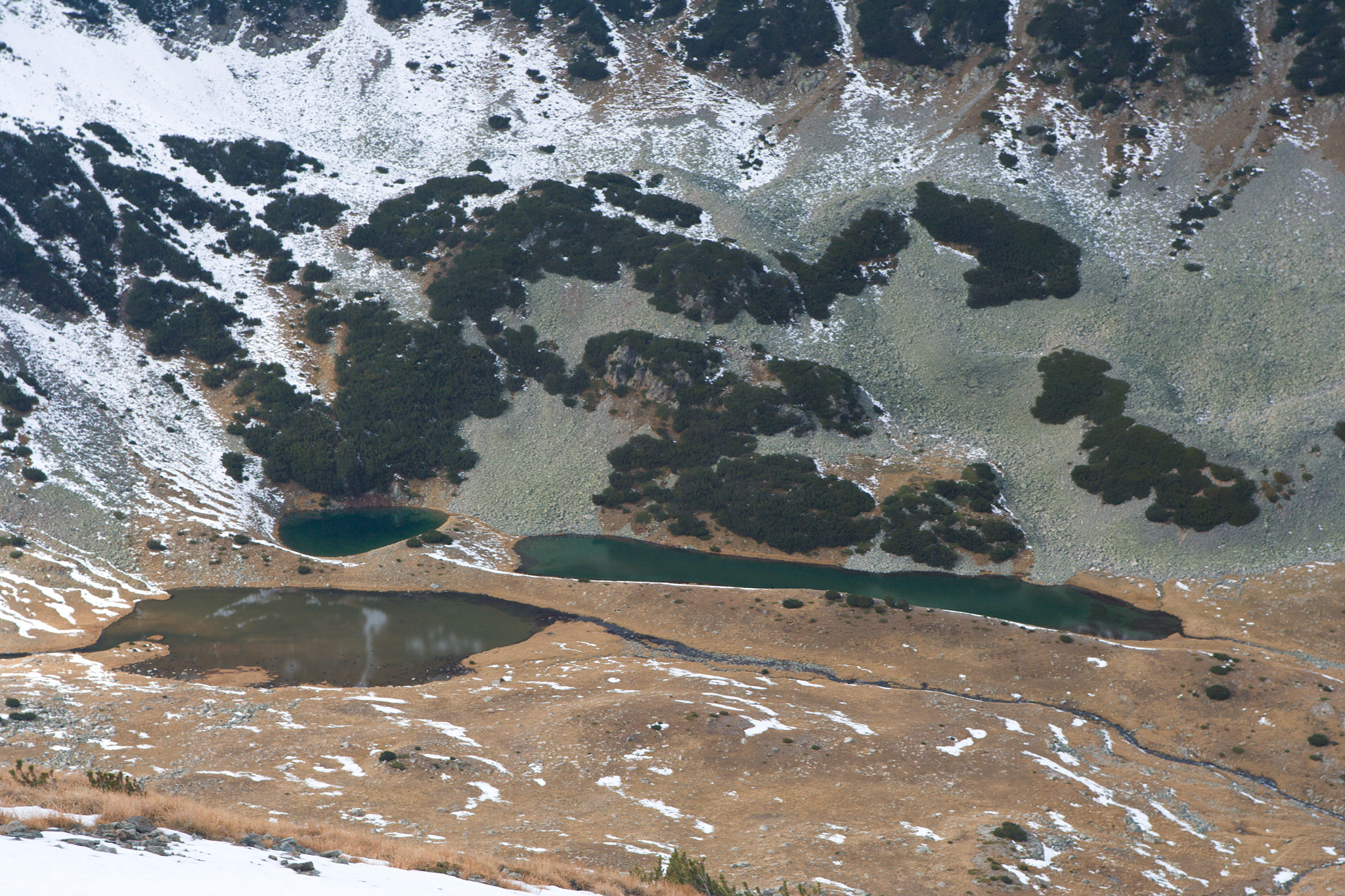
The three lower lakes.

The Vlahini Lakes (Bulgarian: Влахини езера) is a group of six lakes, five of which are permanent, in the Pirin mountain range in southwestern Bulgaria, 1.5 km to the southwest from Vihren. The lakes are named after the village of Vlahi, located at a lower altitude. Other names of the lakes include Vihrenski and Eltepski lakes.

- The first and largest lake is the Big Vlahino lake, at 2,302 m. Its size is 400x245 m, with surface area of 23.4 deciares and depth of 13.4 m. The water capacity is 421,000 m³.
- Below is situated at 2,300 m the smallest lake with size of 68x50 m, area of 3 deciares, depth of 8.4 m and volume of 10,000 m³.
- The third lake is 300 m from the Big Vlahina lake at the same elevation as the second lake. It is elongated (145x100 m) but very shallow- up to 0.8 m. The water capacity is 4,400 m³.
- The fourth lake (2,291 m) is also elongated (245x56 m) and has a surface area of 10 deciares. The amount of water is only 9,000 m³.
- The fifth lake is at the highest altitude among the permanent lakes in the mountains, on the eastern slopes of Gredaro Hill.

The sixth lake is at the highest elevation and is the smallest in area among the group.

The Balkan trout (Salmo farioides) can be found in the lakes. The water pours out as Vlahina river, a tributary of the Struma.

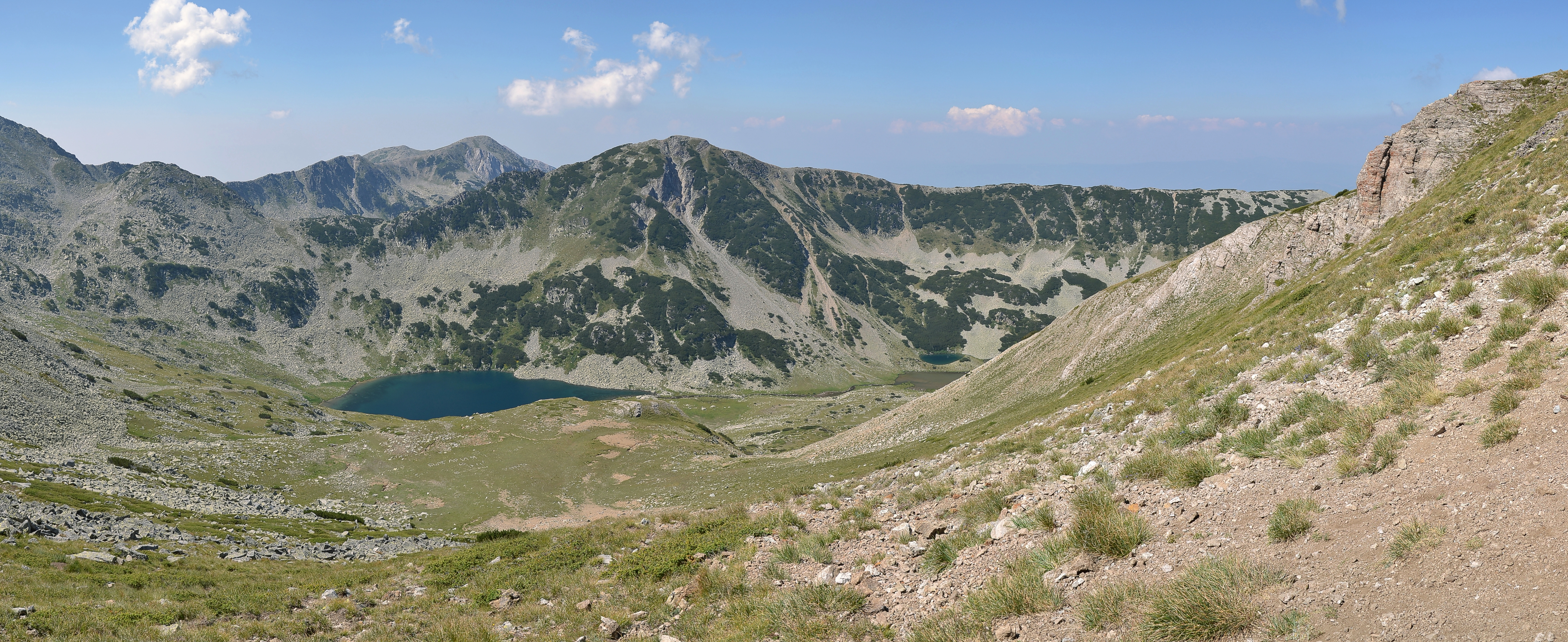
Big Vlahino lake
