= Vihren =

Highest point of Pirin Mountains in Bulgaria

- Вихрен
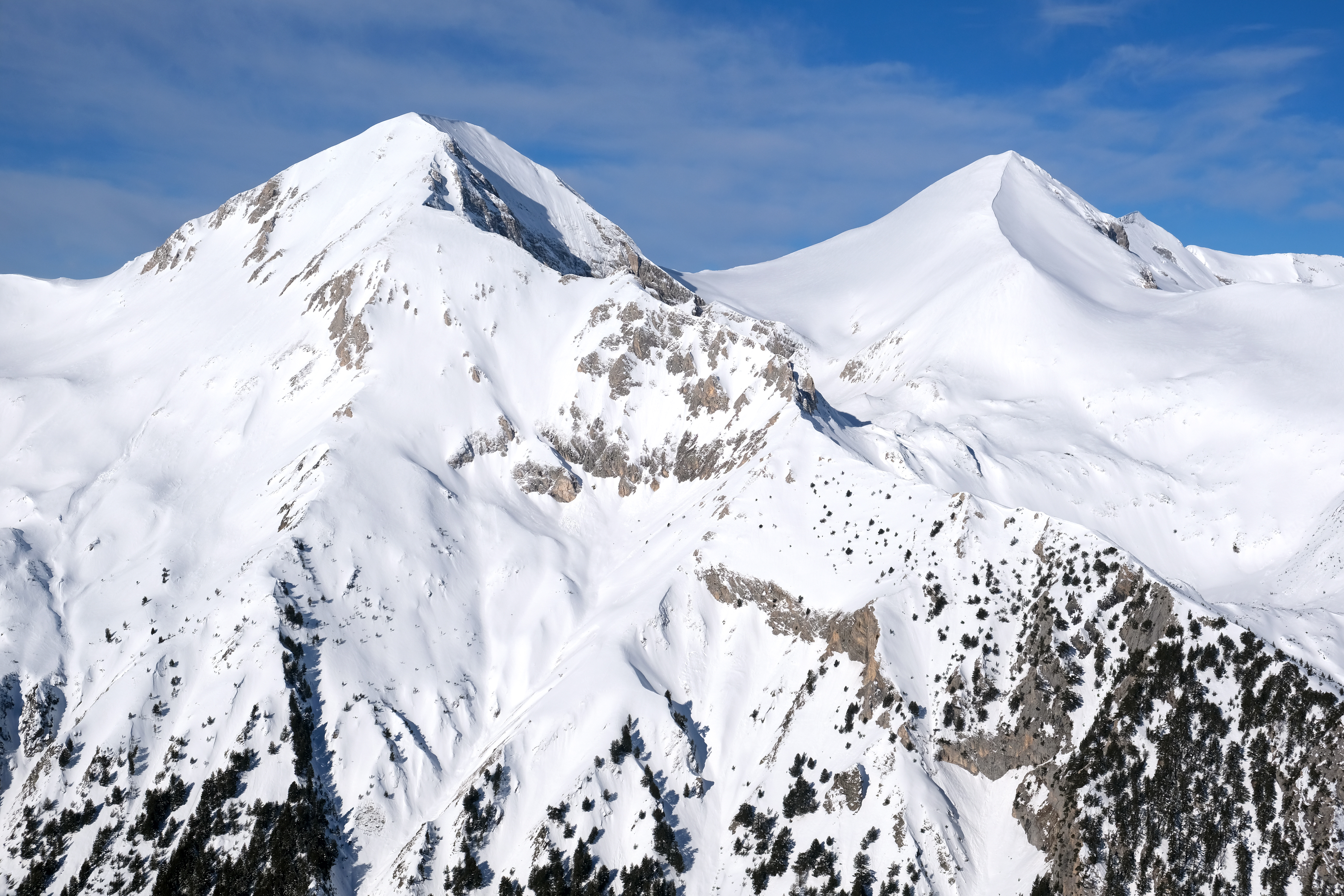
- Vihren with Kutelo peak on the background.

Highest point
- Elevation: 2,914 m (9,560 ft)
- Prominence: 1,783 m (5,850 ft)
- Isolation: 42.3 km (26.3 mi) to Musala
- Listing: Ultra
- Coordinates: 41°46′04″N 23°24′03″E

Geography
- Location within Bulgaria
- Location: Blagoevgrad Province, Bulgaria
- Parent range: Pirin Mountains

Climbing
- Easiest route: Hike/scramble from Vihren refuge

Vihren (Bulgarian: Вихрен [ˈvixrɛn]) is the highest peak of Bulgaria's Pirin Mountains. Reaching 2,914 metres (9,560 ft), it is Bulgaria's second and the Balkans' third highest, after Musala and Mount Olympus. Although Vihren is deprived of lakes and streams due to the karst topography, a number of Pirin's lakes are located around the peak, as is Europe's southernmost glacial mass, the Snezhnika glacieret. Until 1942 Vihren was known as Eltepe (peak of storms); it was also called Buren (stormy) and Malnienosets (lightning-bringer). The UNESCO World Heritage Site Pirin National Park was originally known as the Vihren National Park. Vihren is included in the 100 Tourist Sites of Bulgaria under No. 2.

== Geography ==
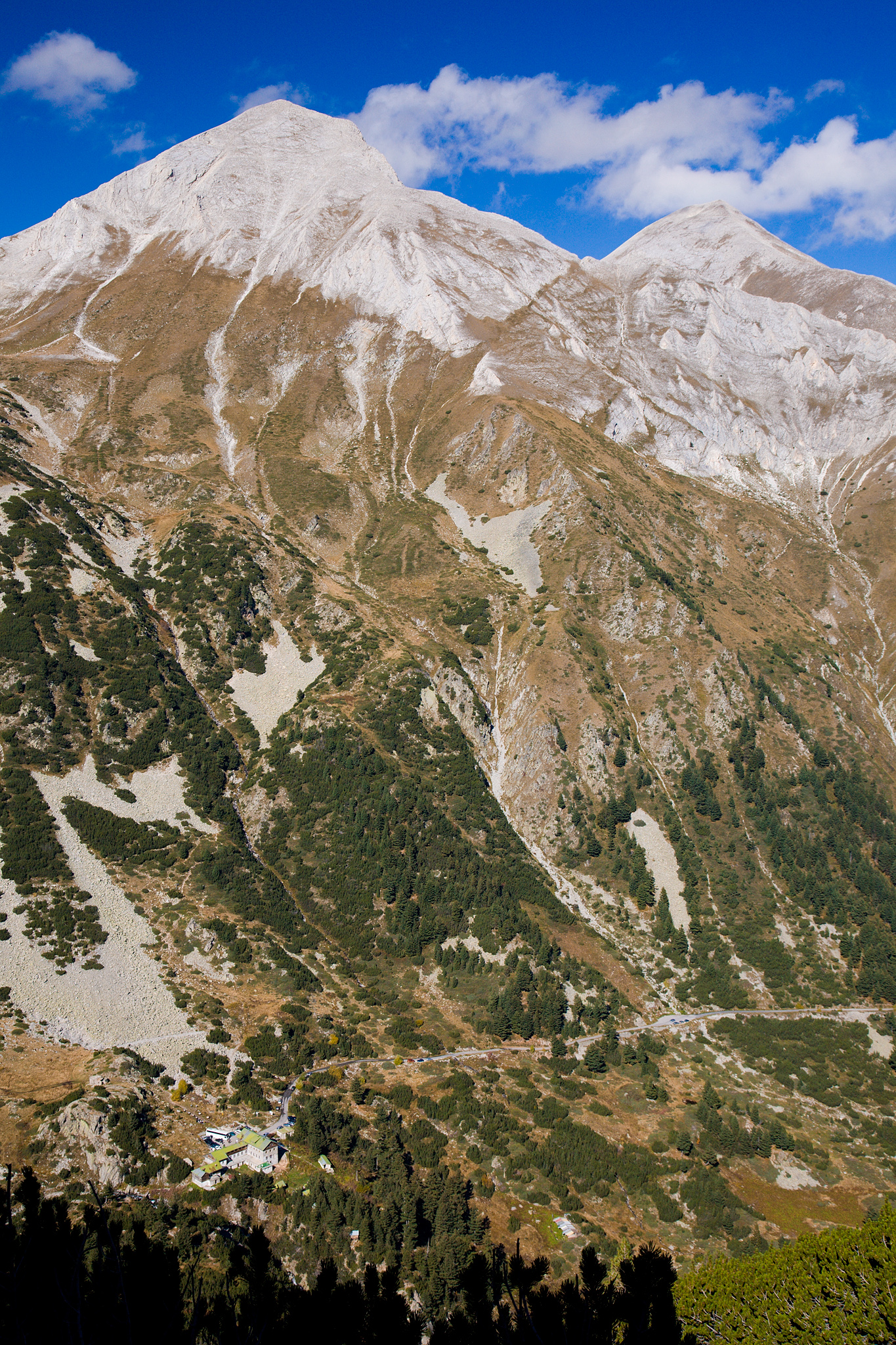
A view of Vihren

Vihren is situated in the northern subdivision of Pirin on the mountain's main ridge between the summits of Kutelo (2,908 m) to the north-west and Hvoynati Vrah (2,635 m) to the south-east. It is connected with these two peaks via the saddles of Premkata (2,610 m) to the north and Kabata (2,535 m) to the south. The summit is located between the valleys of the rivers Vlahina reka of the Struma drainage to the west and Banderitsa of the Mesta drainage to the east.

Seen from the town of Bansko, situated at the foothills of Pirin to the north-east of Vihren, the peak looks like a truncated pyramid, and from the south — like а tetrahedral pyramid. The summit is built up marbles and has a karst topography which determines the lack of streams and lakes around Vihren. The closest lakes are the Vlahini Lakes to the south-west. To the north are situated the deep and waterless cirques Golemiya Kazan and Malkiya Kazan, known as the Kazanite (the cauldrons). Below the 450 m-high walls of Vihren facing Golemiya Kazan there is a small glacier called Snezhnika, which is Europe's southernmost glacial mass. Its size in summer is 80x90 m.

The average annual minimal temperature varies between –25° and –21°С, while the maximal temperatures are between 15° and 23°С. The mean annual precipitation is 1150 mm; the snow cover reaches depth of 3 m. There is a meteorological station at 1,950 m.

== Wildlife ==
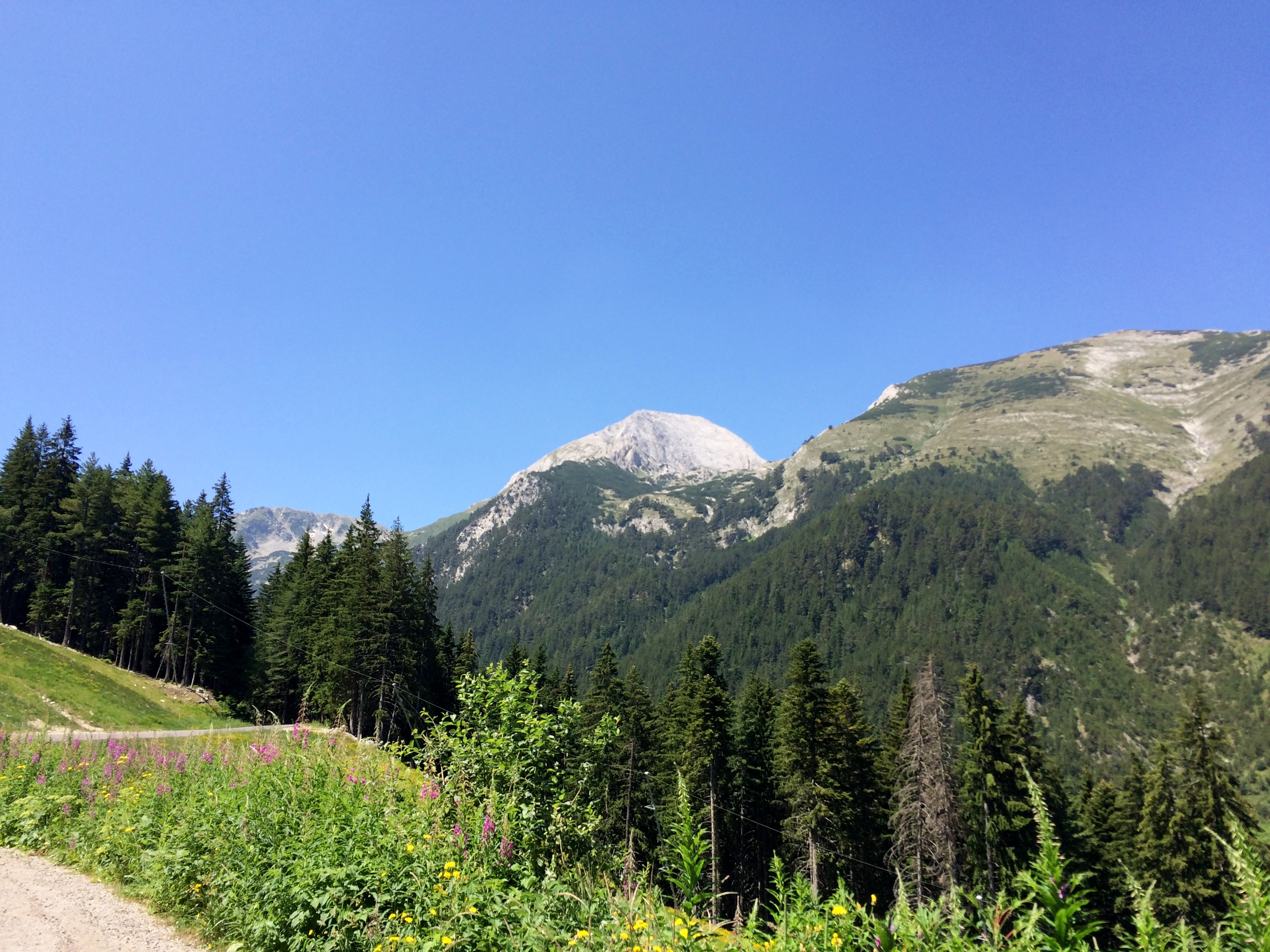
Vihren seen above the forests

The wildlife is alpine. The flora of Vihren's slopes consists of herbaceous plants and lichens. Vihren is home to a number of habitats, including alpine and sub-alpine open calcareous grasslands that at inclination of 30–45° at altitude over 2,500 m on the marble bedrock forms phytocenosis dominated by Sesleria korabensis, and alpine and sub-alpine closed calcareous grasslands on very rocky bedrock. With less abundance is the relict plant Carex rupestris; some plant communities have an abundance of Carex kitaibeliana and Sesleria coerulans. There are also Alyssum cuneifolium, Bellardiochloa variegata, Bromus lacmonicus, Cerastium lanatum, Koeleria eriostachya, Onobrychis pindicola, Scutellaria alpina, Sesleria coerulans, etc. Rare or endemic herbaceous plants that grow on the slopes of Vihren are edelweiss (Leontopodium alpinum), Pirin poppy (Papaver degenii), Oxytropis urumovii, Alyssum pirinicum, Timmia norvegica, Thymus perinicus, etc.

The fauna includes various bird species, small mammals and abundant populations of chamois.

== Tourism ==
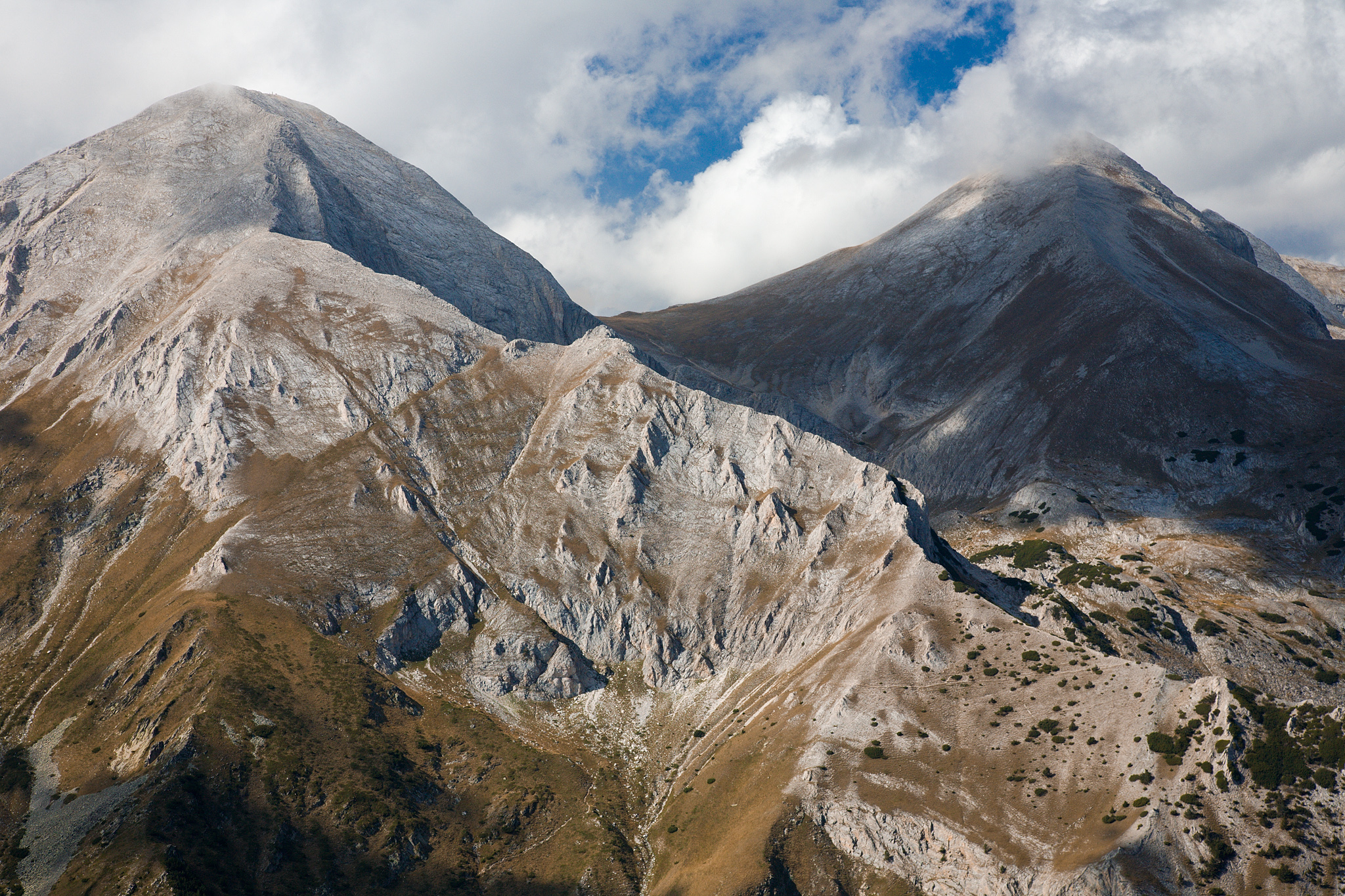
Vihren

Vihren is among the 100 Tourist Sites of Bulgaria under No. 2 and stamps to verify the visit can be found in the Museum of Nikola Vaptsarov in Bansko and in Vihren refuge. The summit is part of the initiative of the Bulgarian Tourist Union "Conqueror of the Top Ten Mountain Peaks" to promote mountaineering.

Vihren was first climbed in winter on 9 January 1925 by T.Atanasov, D.Stoykov, V.Baynov and N.Bozhinov. The classical route to climb the peak is from the Vihren refuge (1,950 m) to the south via the Kabata saddle; this route takes three to four hours in summer and is steep, reaching denivelation of almost 1,000 m in а short time. Other routes include those from the Banderitsa refuge (1,810 m) or across the knife-edge crest Koncheto from the north. From the Kazanite cirques in the north there is a 400 m-high steep wall which has several tracks from alpine climbing. This wall was first climbed in 1934 by the German alpinists W.Mosel and F.Auer; in winter it was first ascended in 1949 by Al.Belkovski and Vl.Lobodin.

From the top there is a view to almost the whole of northern Pirin, as well as to the mountain ranges of Rila, Rhodope, Maleshevo, Ograzhden, Belasica and Slavyanka.

== Honour ==
Vihren Peak on Livingston Island in the South Shetland Islands, Antarctica is named after Vihren.

== See also ==
- Pirin
- Kutelo
- Pirin National Park
- List of mountains in Bulgaria
- Geography of Bulgaria
- List of mountains of the Balkans
- Southernmost glacial mass in Europe
- List of European ultra-prominent peaks
- List of the highest European ultra-prominent peaks
- Most isolated major summits of Europe
- List of mountain ranges
