= List of mountain peaks in Pirin =

This is an incomplete list of mountain peaks in the Pirin mountain range, south-western Bulgaria.

Image	Peak	Height (m)	Coordinates
	Vihren	2914	41°46′02.3″N 23°23′55.9″E
	Kutelo	2908	41°46′36.7″N 23°24′00.1″E
	Banski Suhodol	2884	41°47′03.4″N 23°23′27.3″E
	Polezhan	2851	41°43′30.6″N 23°29′46.3″E
	Kamenitsa	2822	41°41′04.9″N 23°29′20.2″E
	Malak Polezhan	2822	41°43′23.3″N 23°29′23.3″E
	Bayuvi Dupki	2820	41°47′25.8″N 23°22′42.2″E
	Yalovarnika	2763	41°40′19.7″N 23°29′16.3″E
	Gazey	2761	41°43′42.2″N 23°28′58.6″E
	Kaymakchal	2753	41°44′44.1″N 23°29′22.4″E
	Todorka	2746	41°45′09.8″N 23°25′54.4″E
	Banderishki Chukar	2732	41°43′36.1″N 23°25′22.1″E
	Dzhangal	2730	41°42′23.7″N 23°29′52.0″E
	Momin Dvor	2723	41°42′04.3″N 23°29′28.8″E
	Chengelchal	2709	41°41′11.7″N 23°30′55.9″E
	Disilitsa	2700	41°44′50.5″N 23°29′49.3″E
	Zabat	2688	41°40′14.4″N 23°28′37.9″E
	Kuklite	2686	41°39′51.1″N 23°28′15.6″E
	Bashliyski Chukar	2683	41°43′16.5″N 23°25′25.3″E
	Kralev Dvor	2680	41°41′46.6″N 23°29′37.5″E
	Demirchal	2673	41°40′39.8″N 23°31′06.2″E
	Muratov Vrah	2669	41°44′41.9″N 23°23′49.0″E
	Dzhano	2668	41°41′36.7″N 23°30′52.9″E
	Valyavishki Chukar	2664	41°42′10.7″N 23°28′38.3″E
	Demirkapiyski Chuki	2648	41°41′43.1″N 23°30′04.4″E
	Bezbog	2645	41°43′49.8″N 23°30′44.5″E
	Tipitsite	2645	41°43′33.8″N 23°26′57.1″E
	Hleven	2640	41°39′32.6″N 23°31′46.5″E
	Hvoynati Vrah	2635	41°43′22.7″N 23°23′59.8″E
	Golena	2633	41°39′31.6″N 23°28′04.0″E
	Vasilashki Chukar	2615	41°44′06.1″N 23°26′14.0″E
	Gredaro	2606	41°45′06.1″N 23°23′03.1″E
	Mozgovishki Chukar	2605	41°41′52.8″N 23°27′13.68″E
	Prevalski Chukar	2605	41°42′47.1″N 23°27′31.9″E
	Dautov Vrah	2597	41°50′03.1″N 23°19′59.1″E
	Pirin	2593	41°50′49.4″N 23°17′33.8″E
	Sivria	2593	41°42′22.1″N 23°31′05.9″E
	Gergiytsa	2589	41°44′17.3″N 23°22′26.9″E
	Spanopolski Chukar	2576	41°43′48.8″N 23°23′56.1″E
	Pleshki Vrah	2546	41°50′33.0″N 23°18′37.6″E
	Kamenishki Vrah	2532	41°49′19.8″N 23°20′00.0″E
	Sinanitsa	2516	41°43′33.6″N 23°21′29.9″E
	Kelyo	2484	41°39′14.9″N 23°26′36.0″E
	Konarevo	2438	41°46′24.9″N 23°29′34.5″E
	Boykov Vrah	2343	41°38′40.9″N 23°33′05.4″E
	Sharalia	2172	41°43′05.1″N 23°19′36.6″E
	Orelyak	2099	41°34′12.6″N 23°36′45.0″E
	Ushite	1978	41°30′43.9″N 23°38′14.6″E
	Sveshtnik	1975	41°31′17.8″N 23°37′44.9″E
