= Dzhengal =

Bulgarian mountain peak

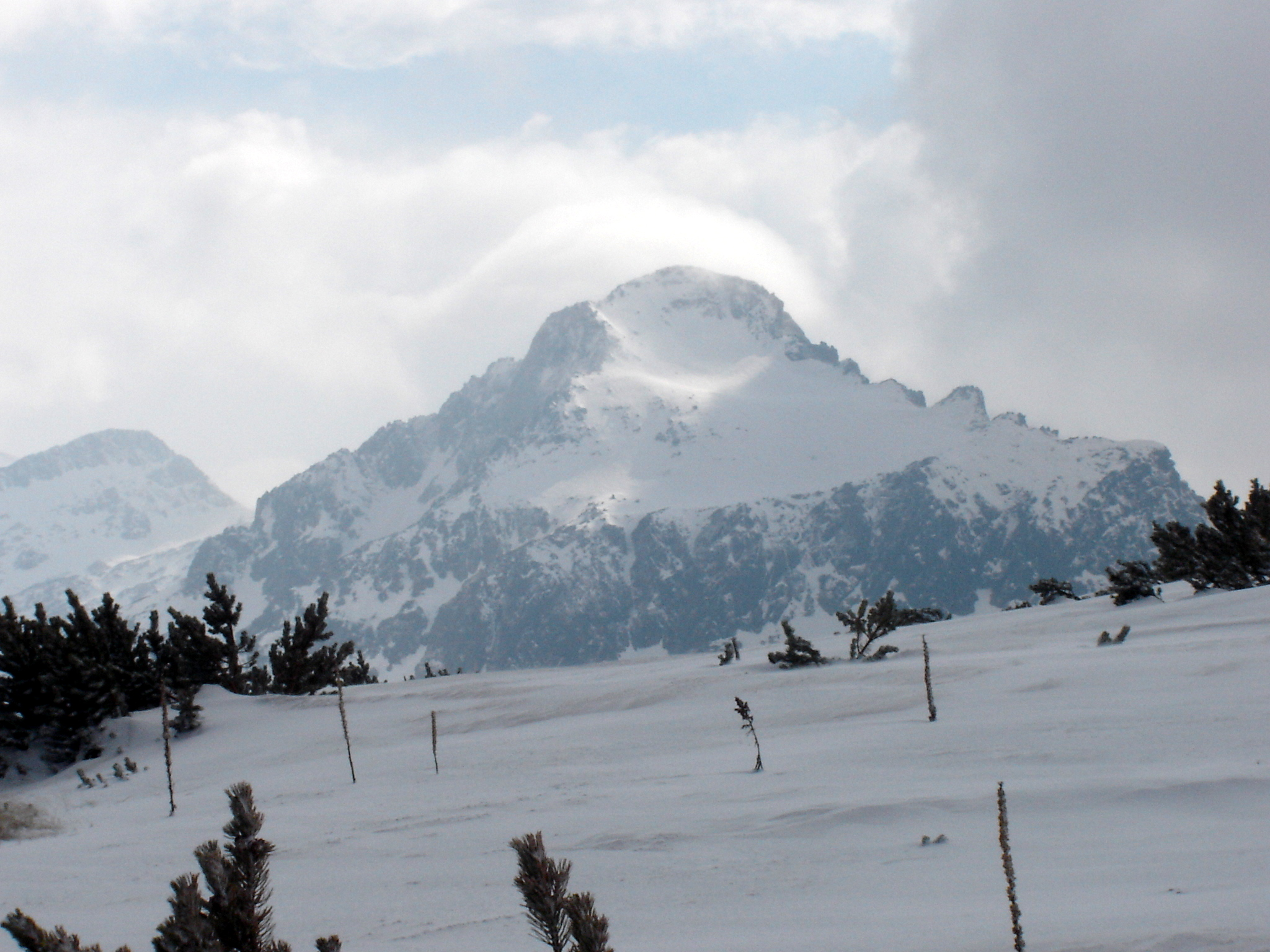

Highest point
- Elevation: 2,730 m (8,960 ft)
- Prominence: 143 m (469 ft)
- Coordinates: 41°42′24″N 23°29′52″E

Geography
- Location within Bulgaria
- Location: Blagoevgrad Province, Bulgaria
- Parent range: Pirin Mountains

Dzhengal (Bulgarian: Дженгал) is a peak in the Pirin mountain range, south-western Bulgaria. It is located in the Pirin National Park, a UNESCO World Heritage Site.

== Geography ==
Dzhengal is situated on one of the external ridges of the mountain, the Polezhan Ridge, between the Dzhengal Gate saddle and the summit of Momin Dvor (2,723 m). It is flanked by the cirques Valyavishki to the west hosting the Valyavishki Lakes and Papagyolski to the east hosting the Popovi Lakes, both of the Mesta river basin. Dzhengal towers to the west of Popovo Lake, the largest glacial lake in the mountain range. Its height is 2,730 m, which places it among the highest summits in Pirin. The summit is built up of granite blocks covered in lichens and mosses.

Dzhengal may be climbed from several points. One of easiest track starts from the Samodivski Lakes and ascends towards Momin Dvor. Another route begins at Tevno Ezero shelter at the Malokamenishki Lakes, ascends to a saddle to the southeast of the summit of Valyavishki Chukar (2,664 m) and reaches Dzhengal from the south. The other ways are more difficult and require fine preparation and experience. The western slopes have 120 m high vertical cliffs with tracks for experience mountain climbers. It is considered to be among Pirin's most beautiful summits.

== Name ==
According to the most popular version, the name derives from the Turkish word dzhangal which means sheep without lamb. When the herds were sheared, those sheep were marked with pendants. If the peak is viewed from the Bezbog refuge it looks like there is a pendant attached to it.

Another legend says that the peak is named after the son of God Perun, Dzhengal. When the evil god Bes (Bez) decided to kidnap Perun's daughter while she was playing around the Samodivski Lakes, her brother guessed his intention and, after a fierce fight, defeated Bez and covered him with stones on the summit of Bezbog (2,645 m). In Bulgarian Bezbog means God Bez or without God.

It has had several other names — Golets, meaning "bare" and Samodivski Vrah, meaning "the summit of the samodiva", legendary woodland fairies or nymphs of the Bulgarian folklore.

== Gallery ==
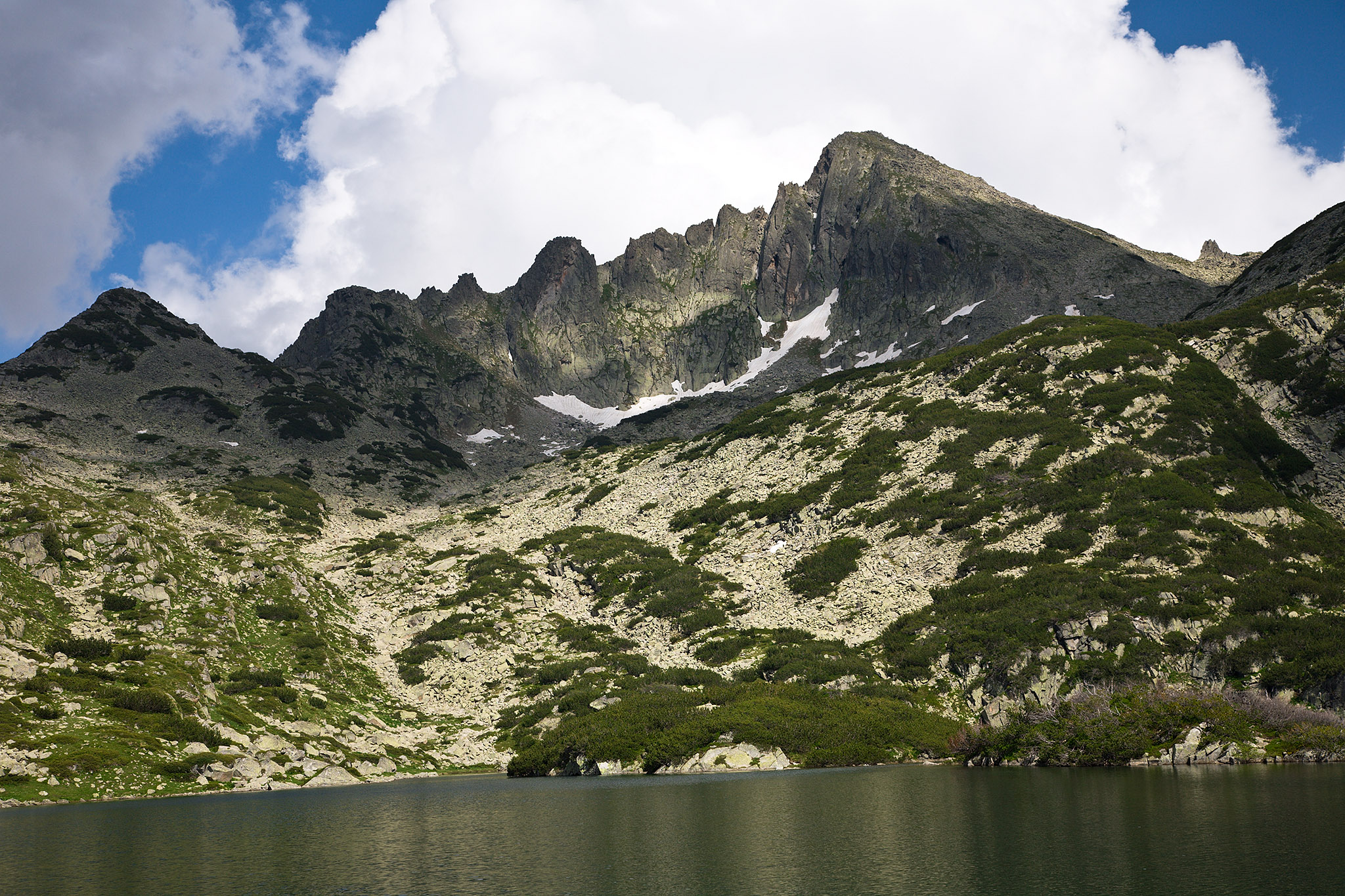

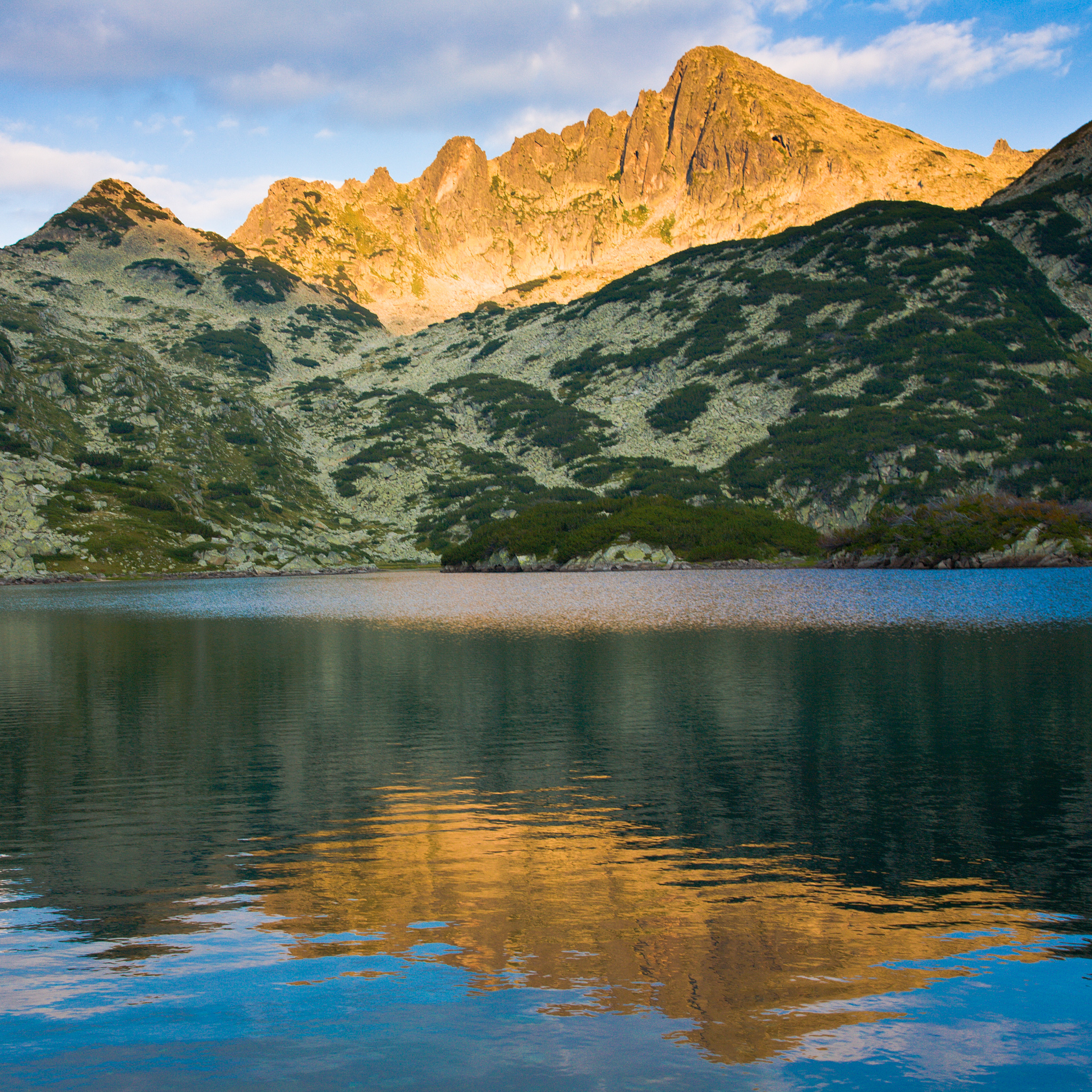

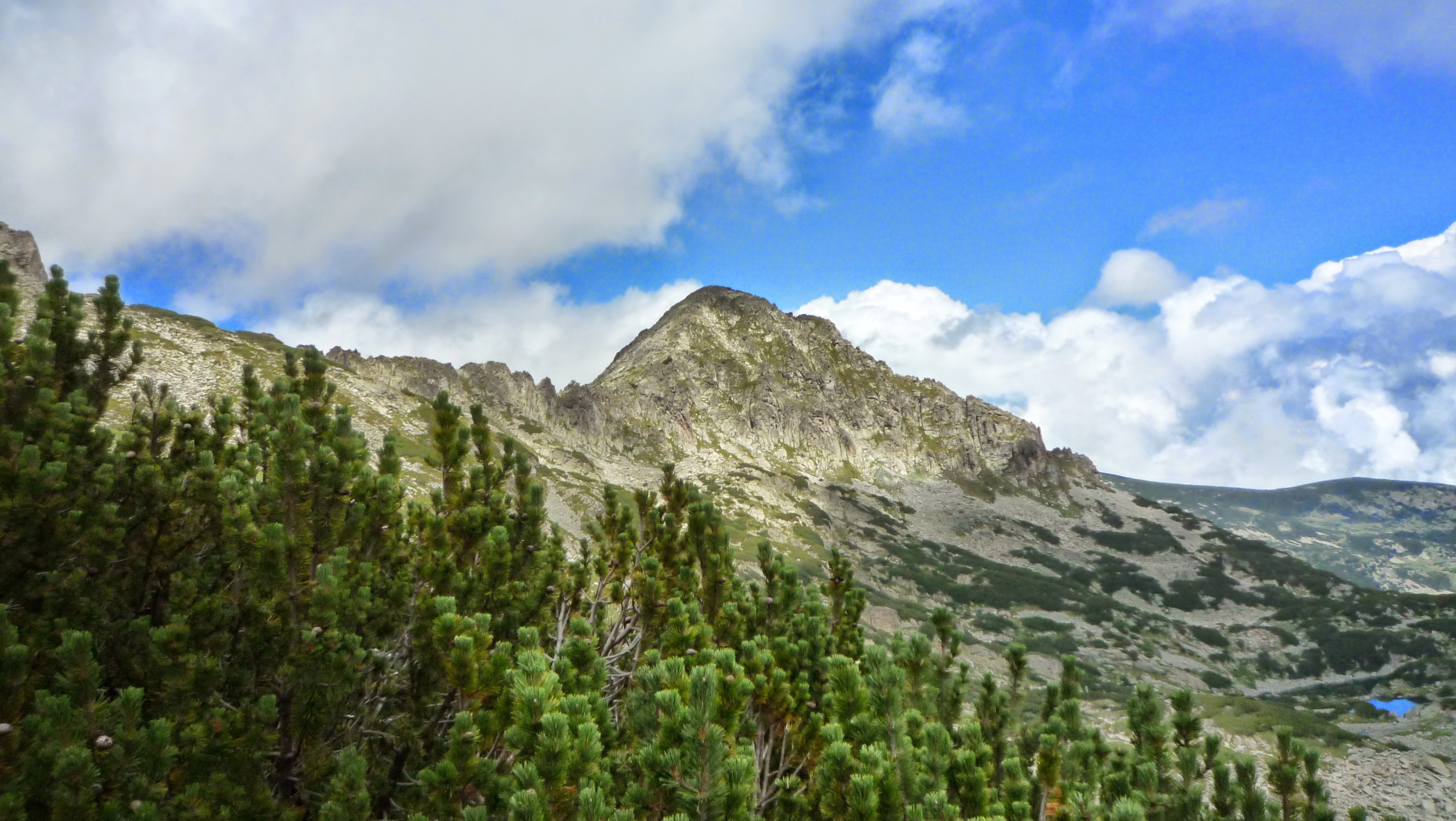

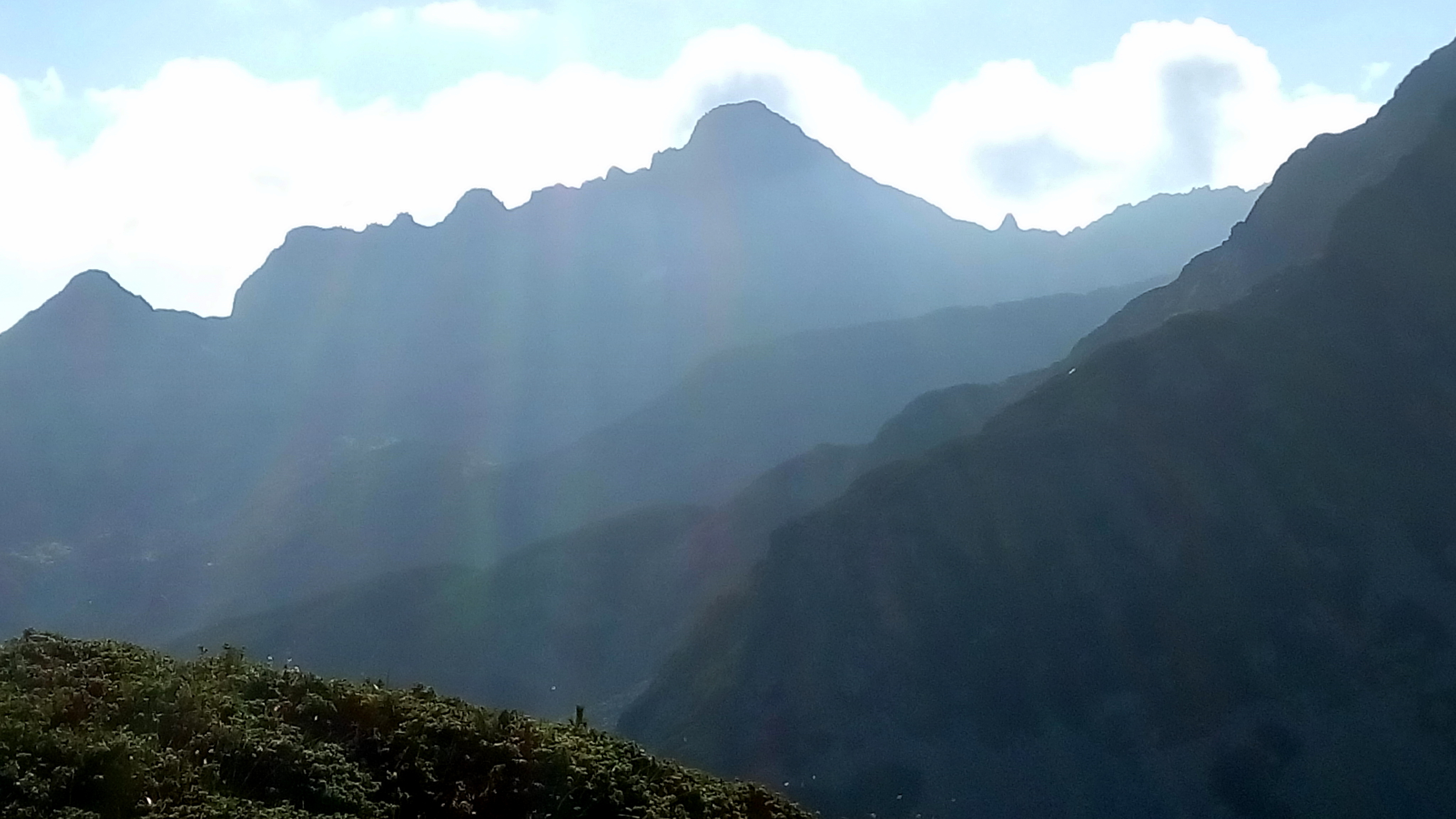

== See also ==
- List of mountain peaks in Pirin
- List of mountains in Bulgaria
- List of mountains of the Balkans
