= Momin Dvor =

Peak in the Pirin range in Bulgaria

Momin Dvor (Момин двор)
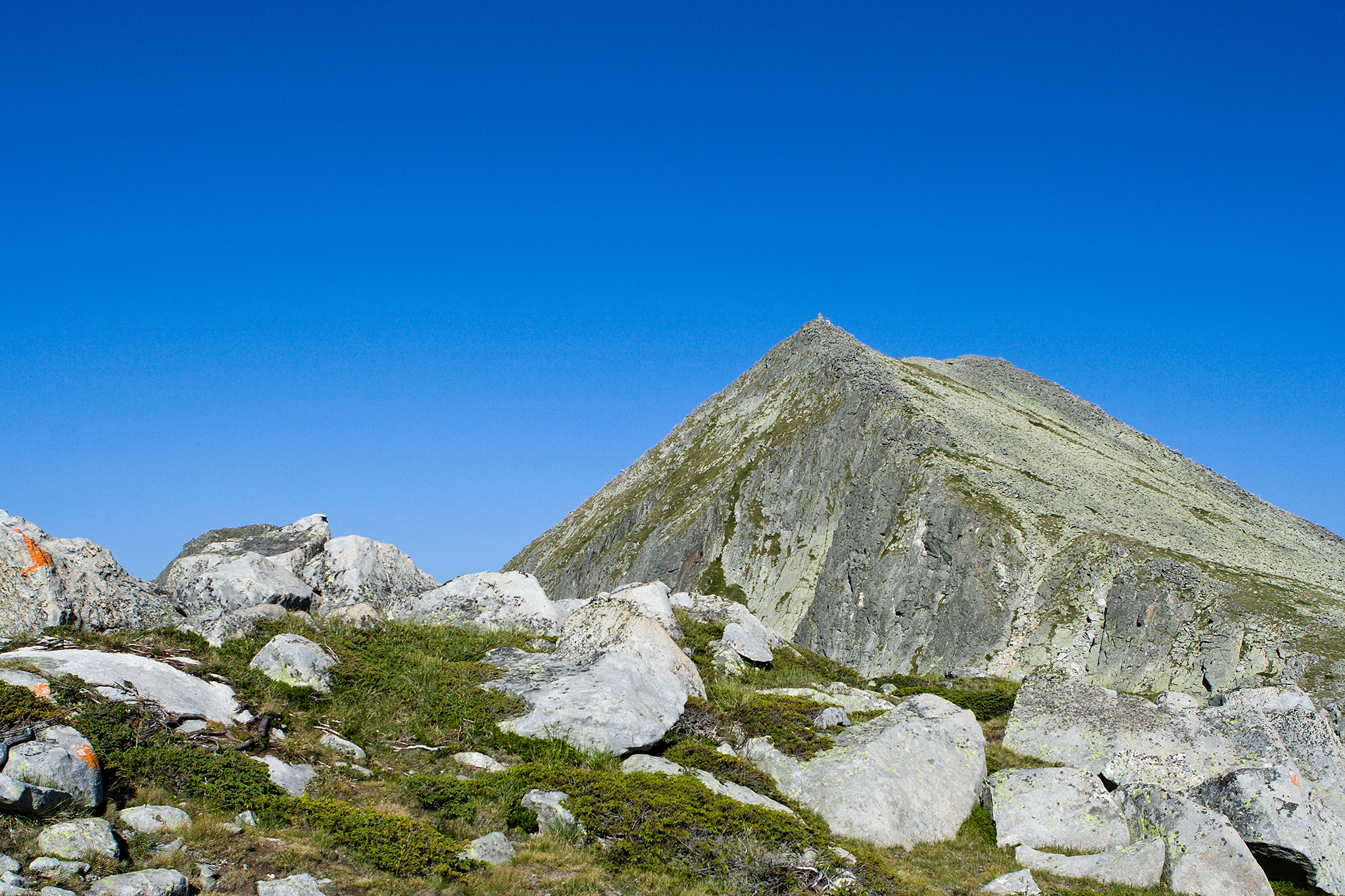

Highest point
- Elevation: 2,723 m (8,934 ft)
- Coordinates: 41°42′4.49″N 23°29′28.8″E

Geography
- Location: Blagoevgrad Province, Bulgaria
- Parent range: Pirin Mountains

Momin Dvor (Bulgarian: Момин двор [ˈmɔmin dvɔr]) is a 2,723 m high peak in the Pirin mountain range, south-western Bulgaria. It is located in the northern part of Pirin on its main ridge between the summits of Kralev Dvor (2,680 m) and Dzhengal (2,730 m). Momin Dvor is pyramid-shaped and was formed by glacial erosion from the three neighbouring cirques: Valyavishki, Popovski and Belemeto. It is built up of porphyry granite.

Three short ridges connect Momin Dvor with the neighbouring peaks. The western ridge links it with Valyavishki Chukar (2,664 m) and at the same time separates the cirques Valyavishki and Belemeto; the ridge is part of a hiking trail leading from Tevno Ezero shelter to Dzhengal Peak. Another ridge stems in south-eastern direction towards Kralev Dvor and forms part of the main trail between Tevno Ezero shelter and Bezbog refuge. To the north-east a more difficultly accessible ridge links Momin Dvor and Dzhengal, situated on the neighbouring Polezhan secondary ridge.

Its name means Maiden's courtyard in Bulgarian and was given to the peak because of the snow on its northern slopes that holds until late summer and appears as clean maiden's laundry hung out in her courtyard. According to local legends god Perun had a younger sister who lived near Samodivski Lakes and used to hang out her laundry on the terraces of Momin Dvor.

== Gallery ==
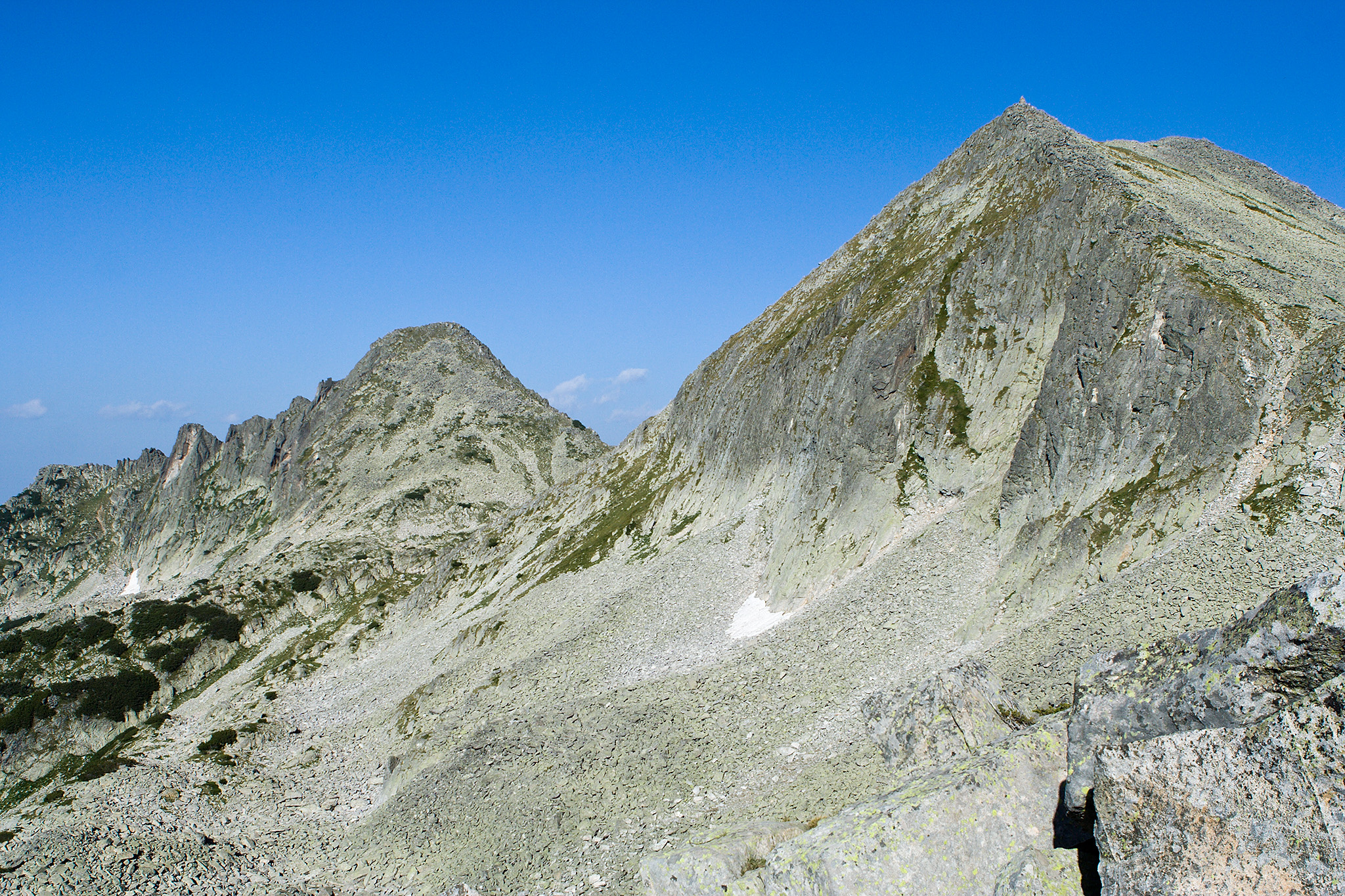

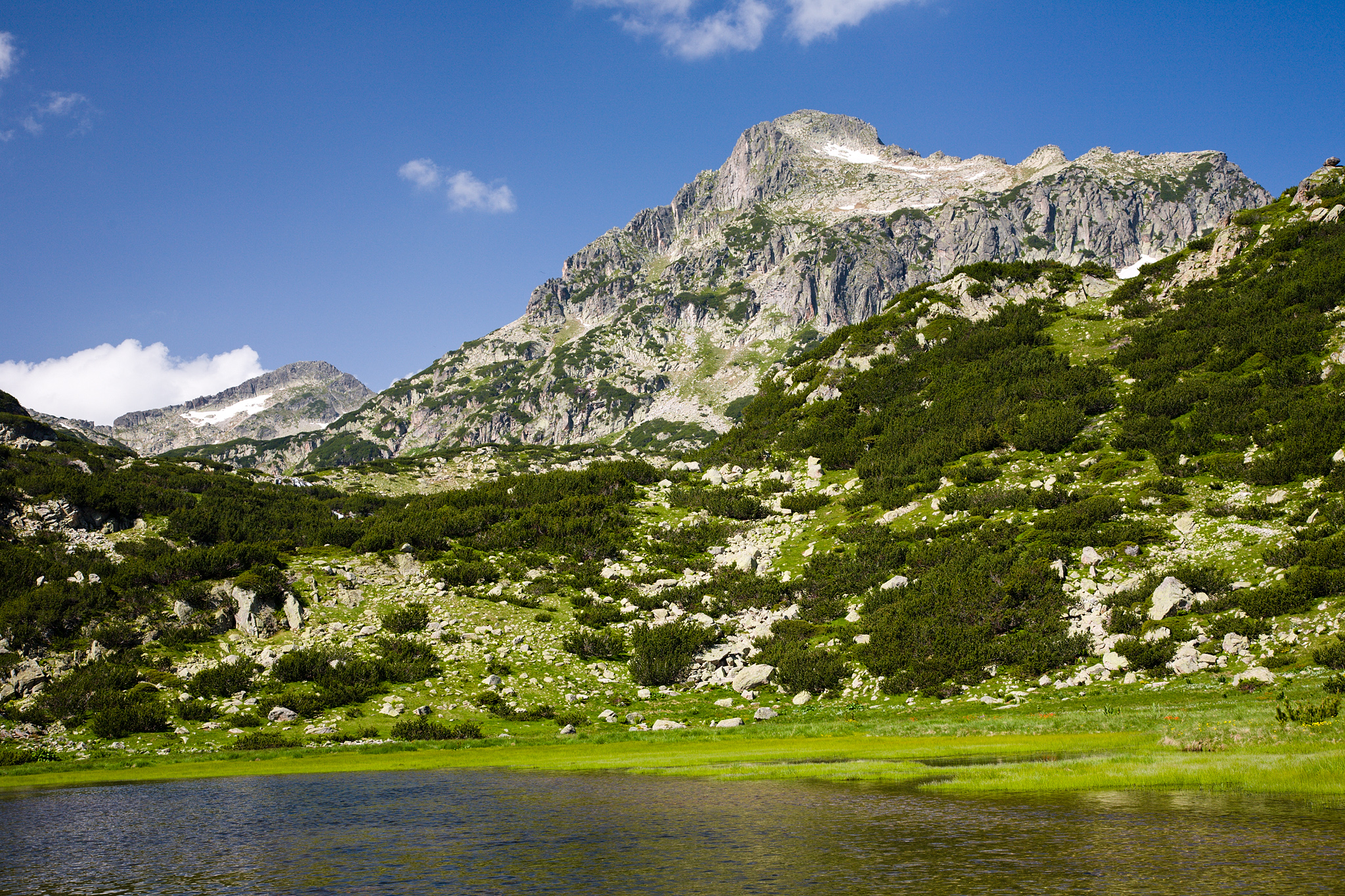

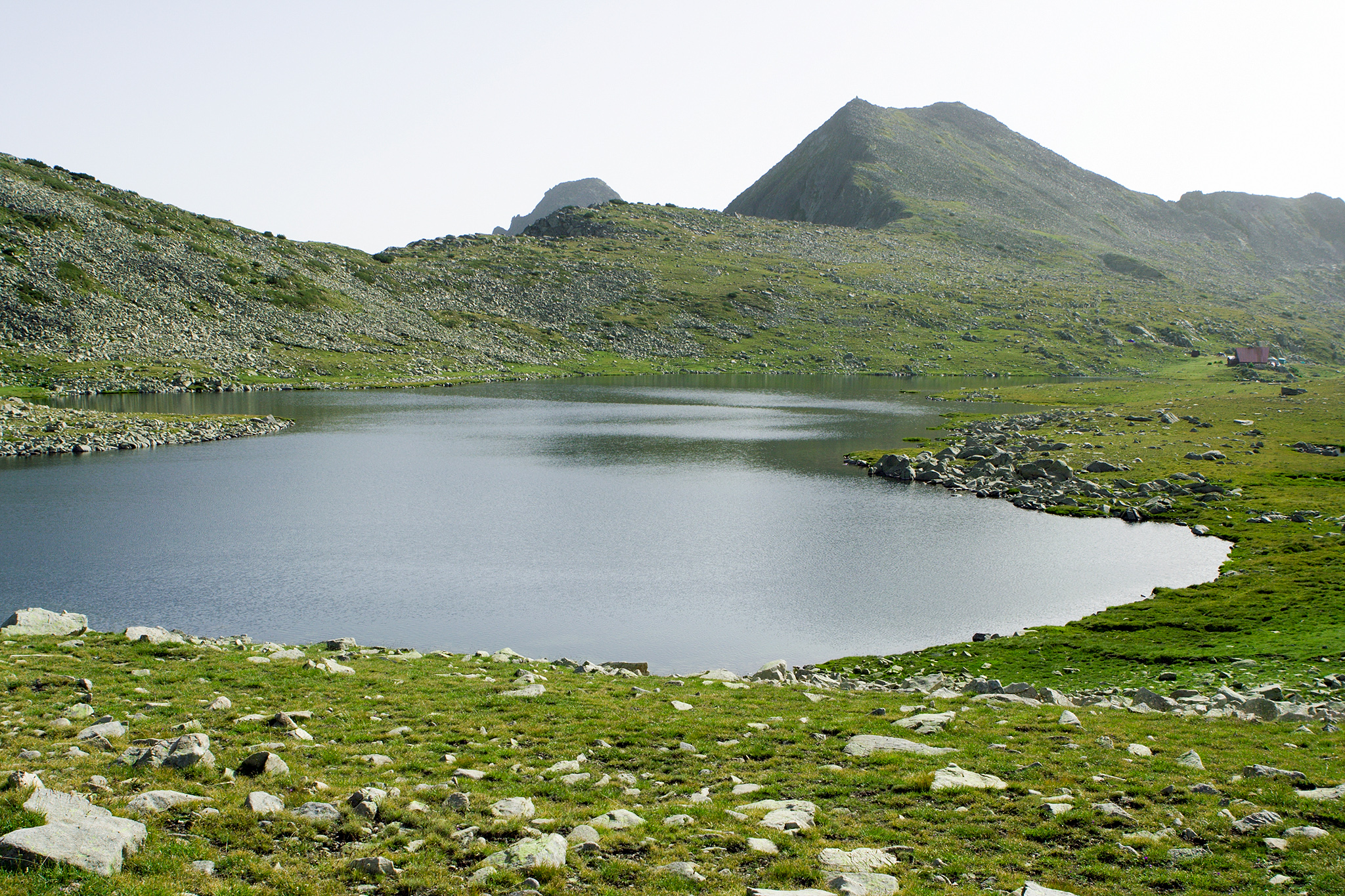
