= Sandanska Bistritsa =

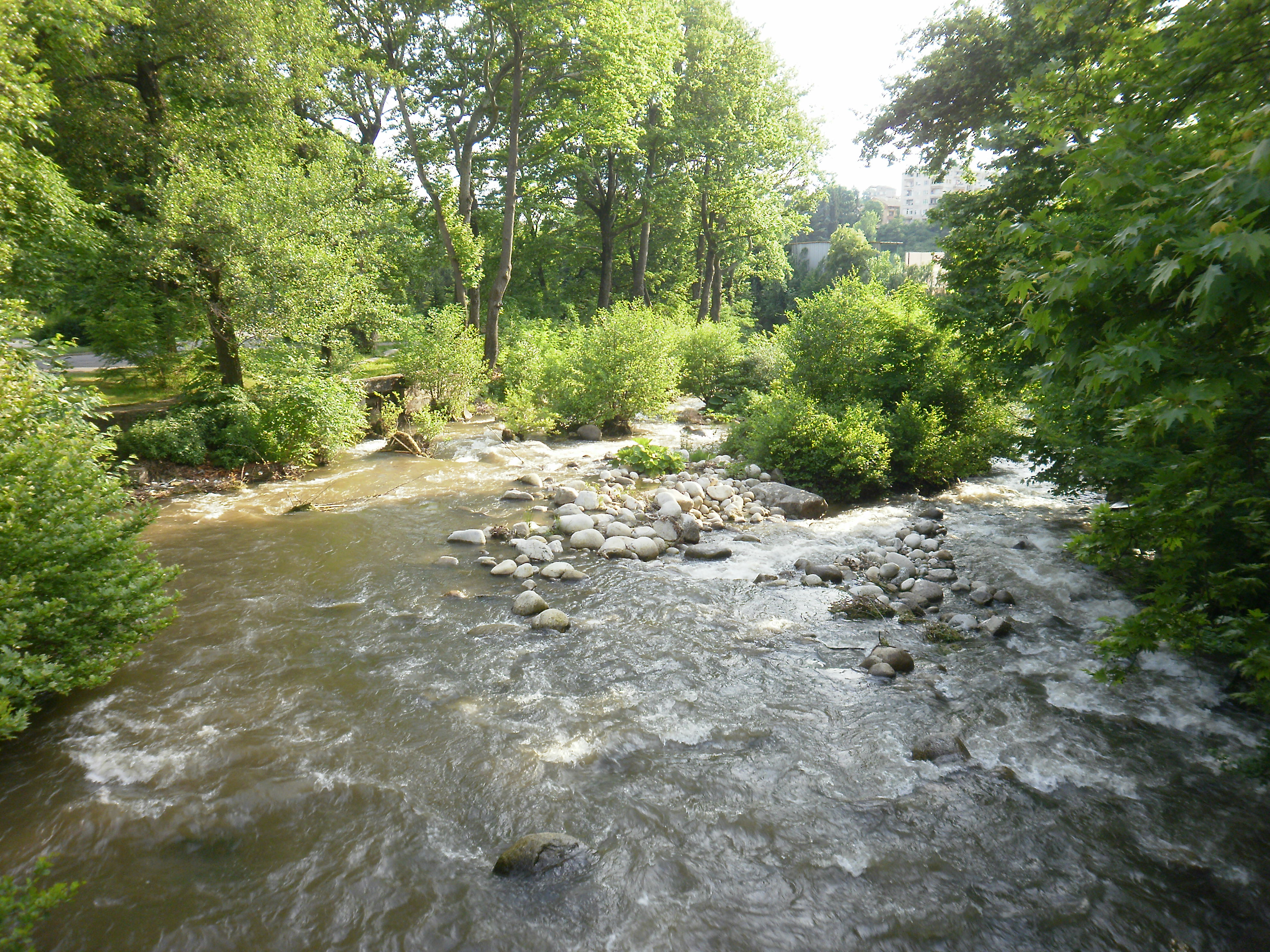
- A view of the Sandanska Bistritsa

Location
- Country: Bulgaria

Physical characteristics
- Source
  - location: Tevnoto Lake, Pirin
  - coordinates: 41°41′54.96″N 23°28′58.08″E
  - elevation: 2,512 m (8,241 ft)
- Mouth
  - location: Struma River
  - coordinates: 41°31′54″N 23°14′53″E
  - elevation: 104 m (341 ft)
- Length: 33 km (21 mi)
- Basin size: 139 km^{2} (54 sq mi)

Basin features
- Progression: Struma→ Aegean Sea

The Sandanska Bistritsa (Bulgarian: Санданска Бистрица) is a river in south-western Bulgaria, a left tributary of the Struma. The river is 33 km long and drains the south-western sections of the Pirin mountain range.

The Sandanska Bistritsa takes its source from the south-eastern corner of the Tevnoto Lake in Northern Pirin at an altitude of 2,512 m. It flows in a southern direction through another four lakes of the Malokamenishki Lakes group and then turns westwards. After the confluence with the first significant right tributary, the Bashliytsa, it turns to the south-west and flows in a deep sparsely forested valley. In the upper course of the river is located the Popinolashki waterfall, one of Pirin's largest. Near the town of Sandanski the river enters the Sandanski–Petrich Valley forming a large mucous cone. It flows into the Struma at an altitude of 104 m near the Sandanski industrial zone.

Its drainage basin covers a territory of 139 km^{2} or 0.8% of Struma's total.

The Sandanska Bistritsa River has predominantly snow-rain feed with high water in late spring (May) and low water in late summer (September). The average annual flow is 3.35 m^{3}/s at the village of Lilyanovo and 2.9 m^{3}/s at the confluence with the Struma.

There are 3 settlements along the river, all of them situated in Sandanski Municipality: one town, Sandanski, and two villages, Lilyanovo and Stozha, as well as the resorts of Popina Luka and Tremoshnitsa. The river's waters are utilised for electrical power generation with three hydropower plants at Popina Luka, Lilyanovo and Sandanski I with a total installed capacity of 56 MW, as well as for irrigation.
