= Stozha =

Stozha Стожа
- Village
- Location within Bulgaria
- Coordinates: 41°37′N 23°19′E
- Country: Bulgaria
- Province: Blagoevgrad Province
- Municipality: Sandanski
- Elevation: 676 m (2,218 ft)

Population (2015)
  - Total: 75
- Time zone: UTC+2 (EET)
  - Summer (DST): UTC+3 (EEST)

Stozha (Bulgarian: Стожа) is a village in the municipality of Sandanski in Blagoevgrad Province, south-western Bulgaria. It is situated on the south-western foothills of the Pirin mountain range along the banks of the Sandanska Bistritsa river.
