= Popovo Lake =

Lake in Bulgaria

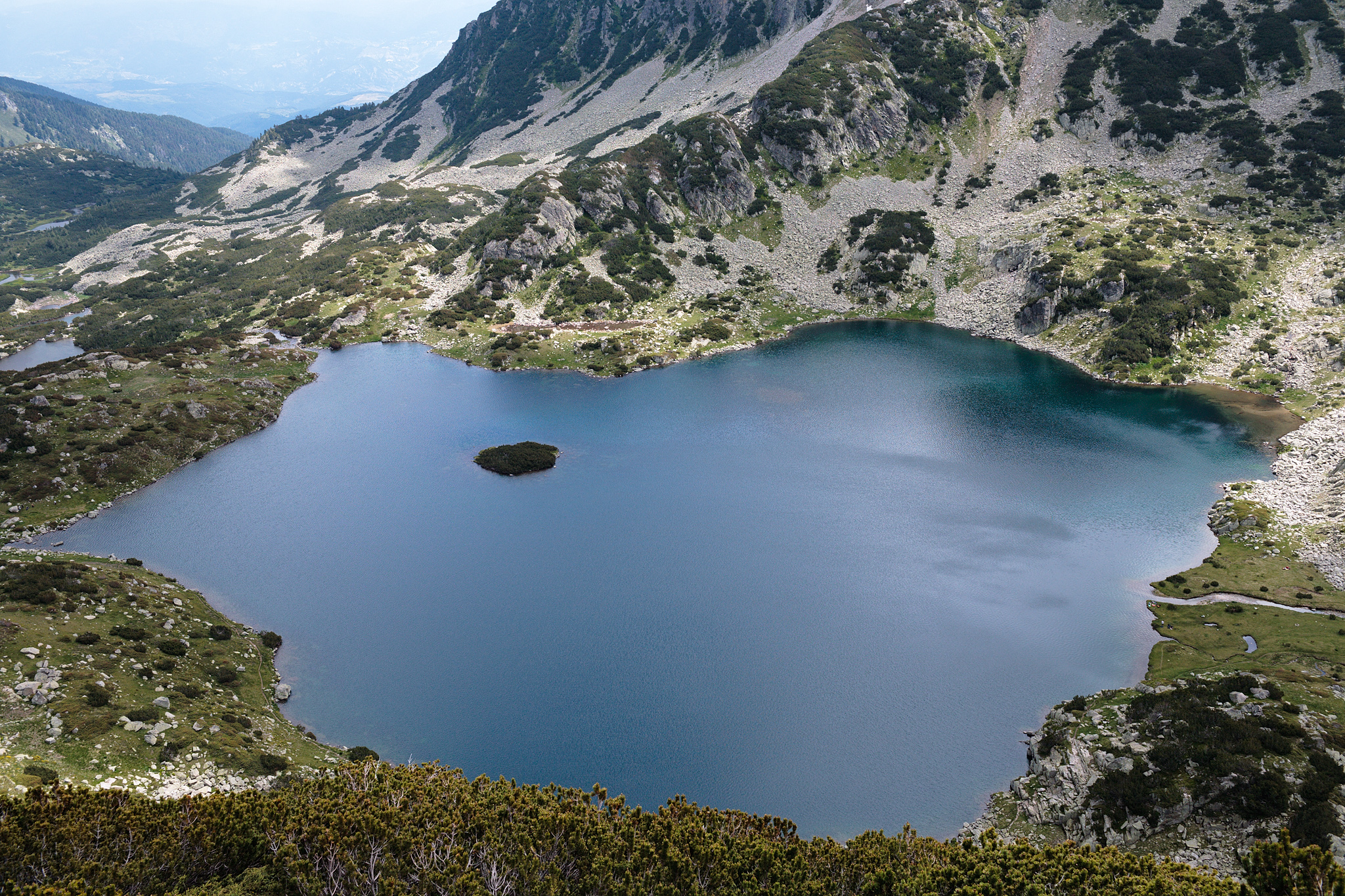
- View from Dzhano

- Location within Bulgaria
- Coordinates: 41°42′28″N 23°30′29″E
- Primary inflows: precipitation
- Basin countries: Bulgaria
- Max. length: 480 m (1,570 ft)
- Max. width: 336 m (1,102 ft)
- Surface area: 123,600 m^{2} (1,330,000 sq ft)
- Max. depth: 29.5 m (97 ft)
- Water volume: 1.27×10^{6} m^{3} (1,030 acre⋅ft)
- Surface elevation: 2,234 m (7,329 ft)

Popovo Lake (Bulgarian: Попово езеро) is a glacial lake situated in the northern section of the Pirin mountain range, south-western Bulgaria. It is one of the eleven Popovi Lakes. The lake and its surroundings are among the most popular places for summer tourism in Pirin National Park. It is situated at the bottom of the Popovski cirque and is surrounded by the peaks Sivria (2,591 m), Dzhano (2,668 m), Kralev Dvor (2,680 m), Momin Dvor (2,723 m) and Dzhengal (2,730 m).

The lake is situated at an altitude of 2,234 m. Popovo Lake is Pirin's largest by area and volume, and also the deepest one in the massif. It has the shape of irregular pentagon and features a small islet. The maximum length is 480 m; the width is 336 m. Its surface area is 123,600 m^{2}, which places it fourth among Bulgaria's glacial lakes by total area, after Smradlivo Lake, the Upper Fish Lake and Bliznaka, all of them in the Rila mountain range. It is 29.5 m deep is second in the country after Okoto Lake in Rila, which reaches depth of 37.7 m. Its volume is around 1,270,000 m^{3}. In summer the water temperature reaches 14–16 °C at the surface and decreases to 5–6 °C in the deeper layers.

Popovo Lake takes water from rainfall, snowfall and two tiny springs which pour into the southern end of the lake. The biggest amount of water can be observed in late spring during the snow melting from surrounding peaks. The water that pours out of the lake forms the river Retizhe, a right tributary of the Mesta. The Retizhe flows to the seven Fish Popovski Lakes and drains the whole Popovski cirque. The area around the lake is dotted with meadows and mountain pine (Pinus mugo), whose age is above 100 years at places.

In Bulgarian language the name of the lake means the Lake of the Priest. There are two legends about it origin. According to the more popular one, a priest threw himself into the water because the Ottoman Turks had violated his daughter. His cap surfaced and made the little islet in the middle of the lake. The other legend suggests that after the Christianization of Bulgaria in the 9th century, a priest decided to climb the Pirin mountain and expel the Slavic god Perun. He found him but Perun was enraged by his audacity and threw him into the lake. Again, his cap emerged from the water and formed the islet.

== Gallery ==
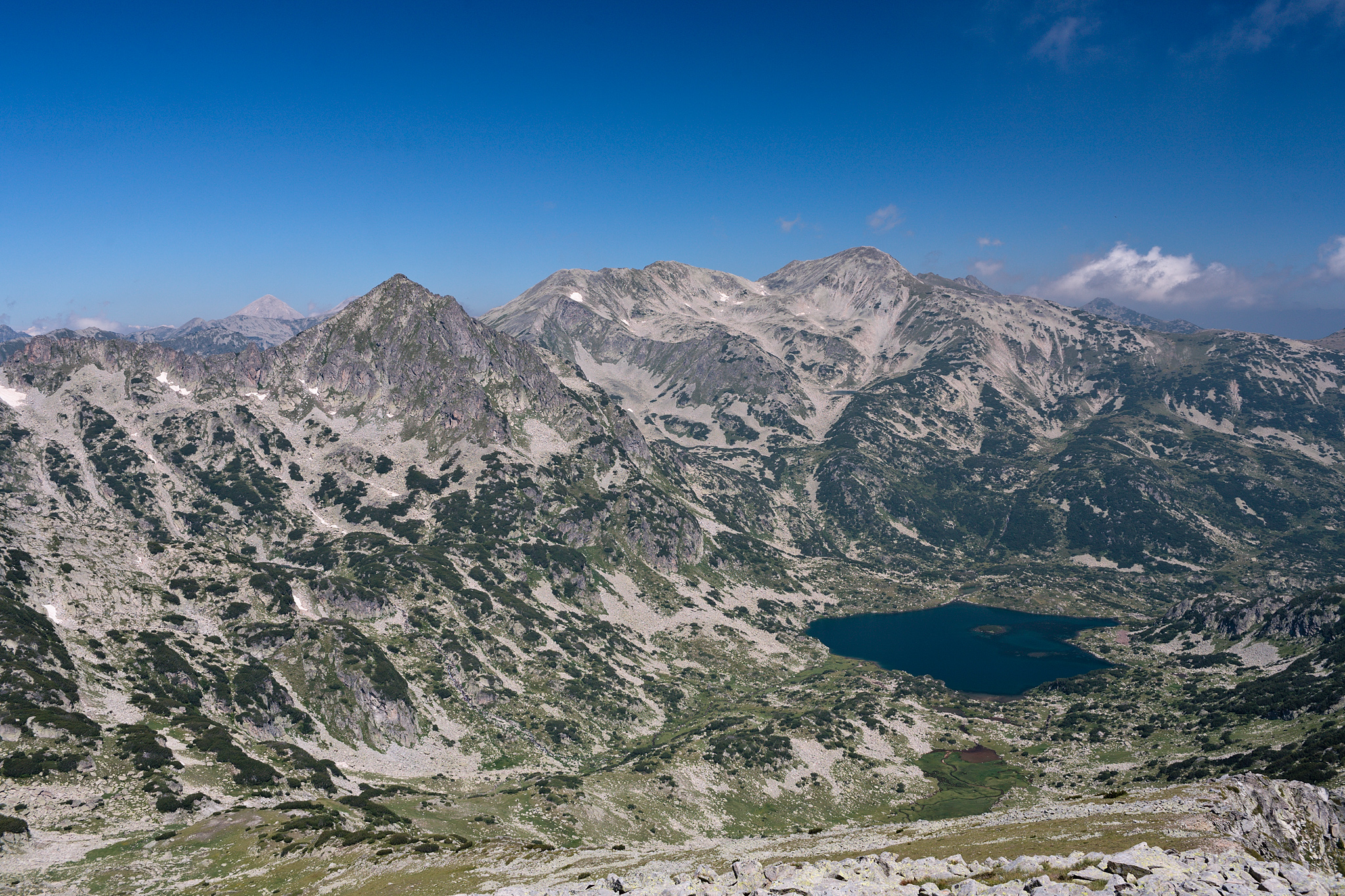

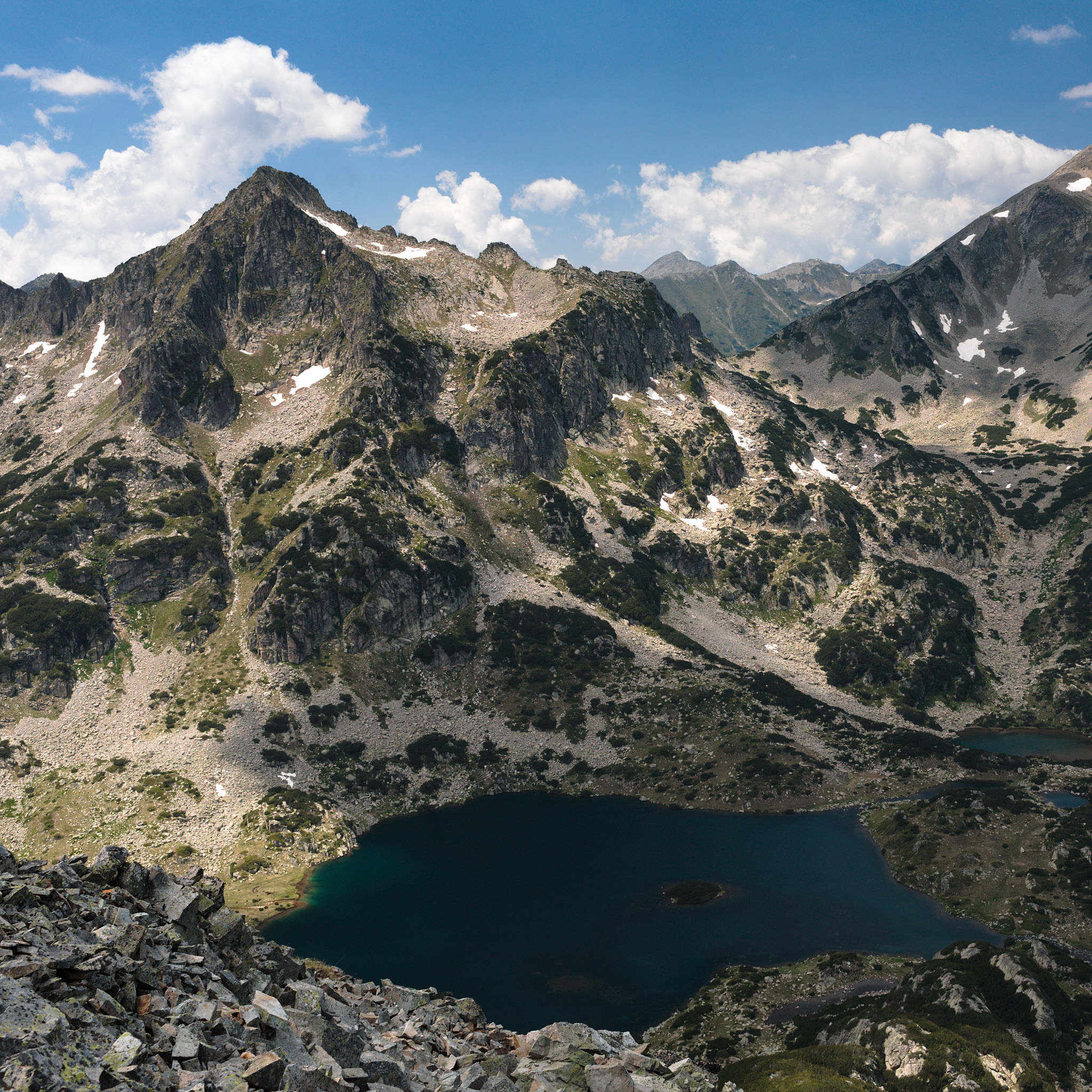

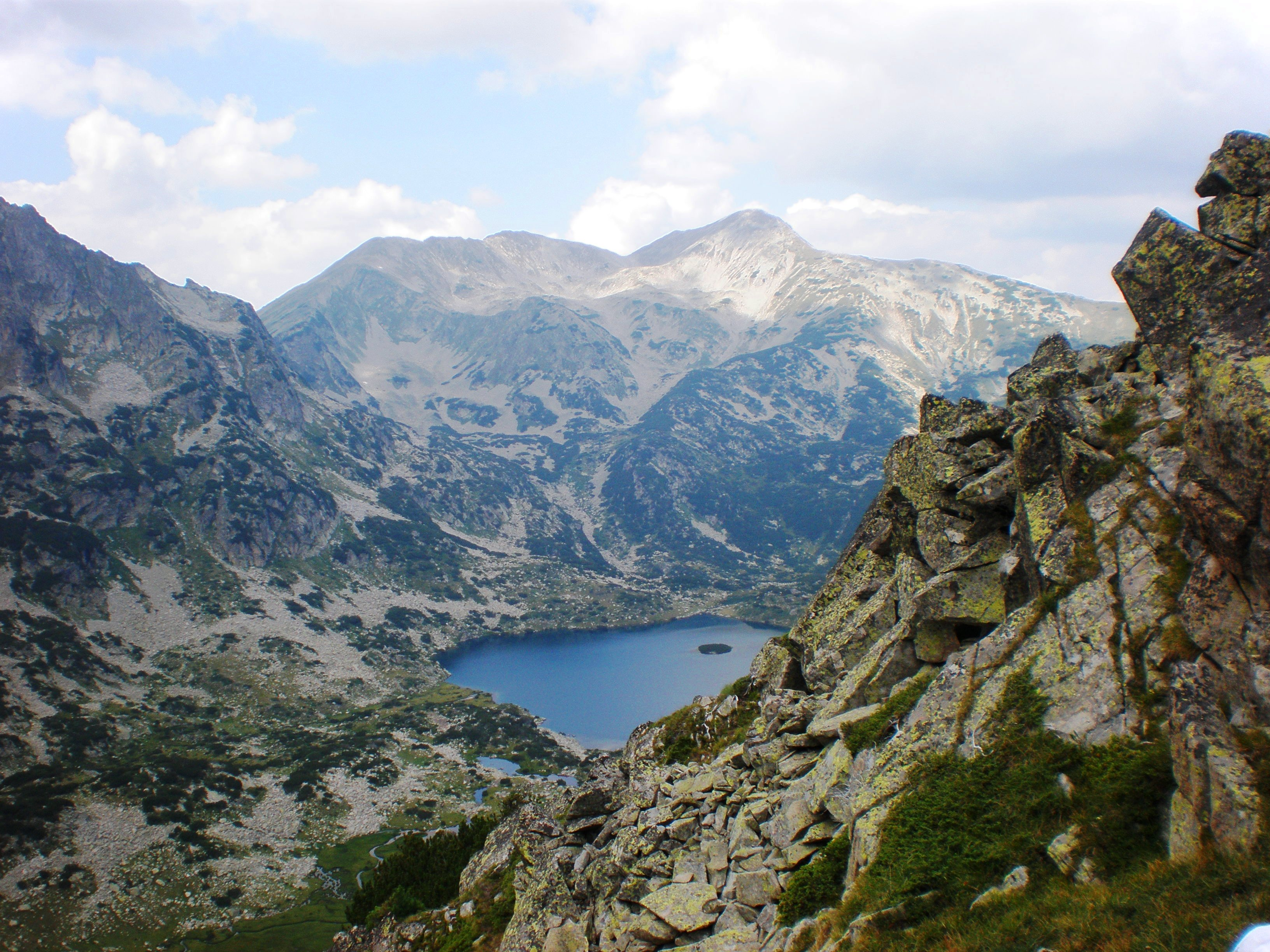

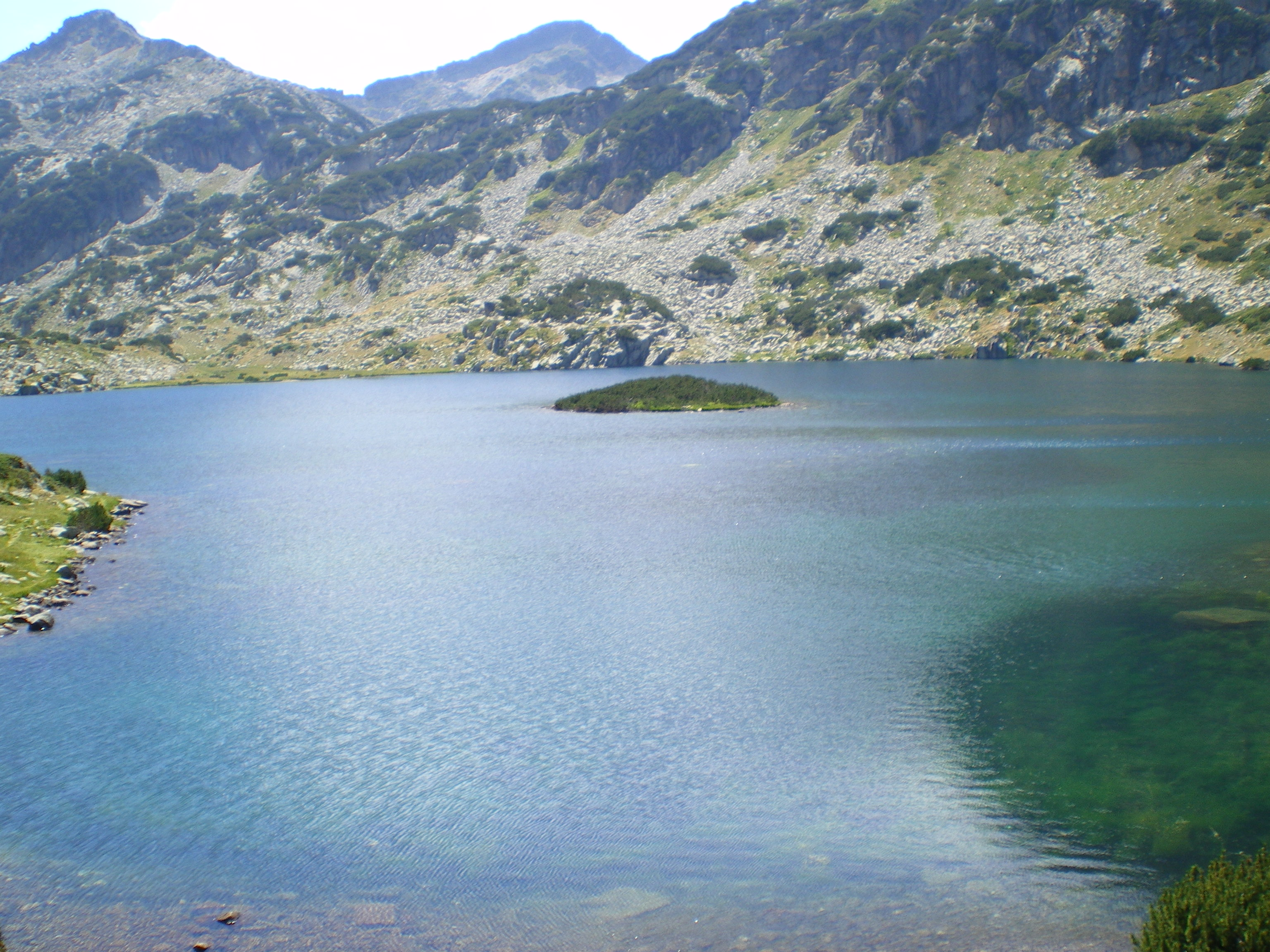
