= Samodivski Lakes =

Lakes in Bulgaria

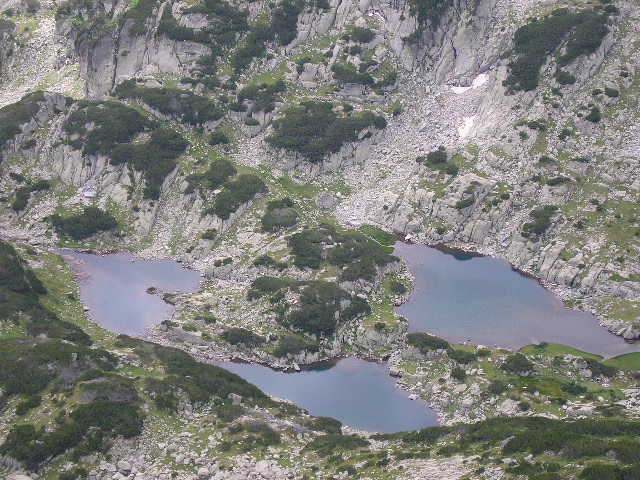
The Samodivski Lakes

The Samodivski Lakes (Bulgarian: Самодивски езера) is a small group of lakes in Pirin, southwestern Bulgaria, part of the larger group of Popovski lakes. They are situated very close to each other in a small cirque to the south west of the Popovo Lake between the peak Dzhengal, Momin Dvor and Kralev Dvor. They are situated at an altitude of 2,373 m, 2,375 m, 2,372 m. The highest has a shape of a boat with size of 75x85 m and surface of 3,20 decares; the second one resembles a kidney and is longer (100x35 m) with area of 2,20 decares; the lowest is also the smallest one with size of 50x20 m and surface of only 1 decare. The Samodivski lakes are considered as one of the most beautiful in Pirin and with good reason: they are nestled among high rocks, a small stream curves between them which even forms a tiny waterfall between the higher lakes. They names derives from the folklore beliefs that the wood nymphs gather around at night. According to the legend, the area was home of the daughter of the Slavic god Perun. The track between the Bezbog refuge and the Tevno Lake passes nearby. There are suitable places for camping.
