= Lilyanovo =

Lilyanovo Лиляново
- Village
- Location within Bulgaria
- Coordinates: 41°37′N 23°19′E
- Country: Bulgaria
- Province: Blagoevgrad Province
- Municipality: Sandanski

Area
  - Total: 76.502 km^{2} (29.538 sq mi)
- Elevation: 676 m (2,218 ft)

Population (2015)
  - Total: 223
- Time zone: UTC+2 (EET)
  - Summer (DST): UTC+3 (EEST)

Lilyanovo (Bulgarian: Лиляново) is a village in the municipality of Sandanski, in Blagoevgrad Province, Bulgaria. It is situated on the south-western foothills of the Pirin mountain range along the banks of the Sandanska Bistritsa river. The village is located on the road between the town of Sandanski and the Popina Laka recreational area in Pirin.
