= Kralev Dvor =

Bulgarian mountain peak

Kralev Dvor (Кралев двор)
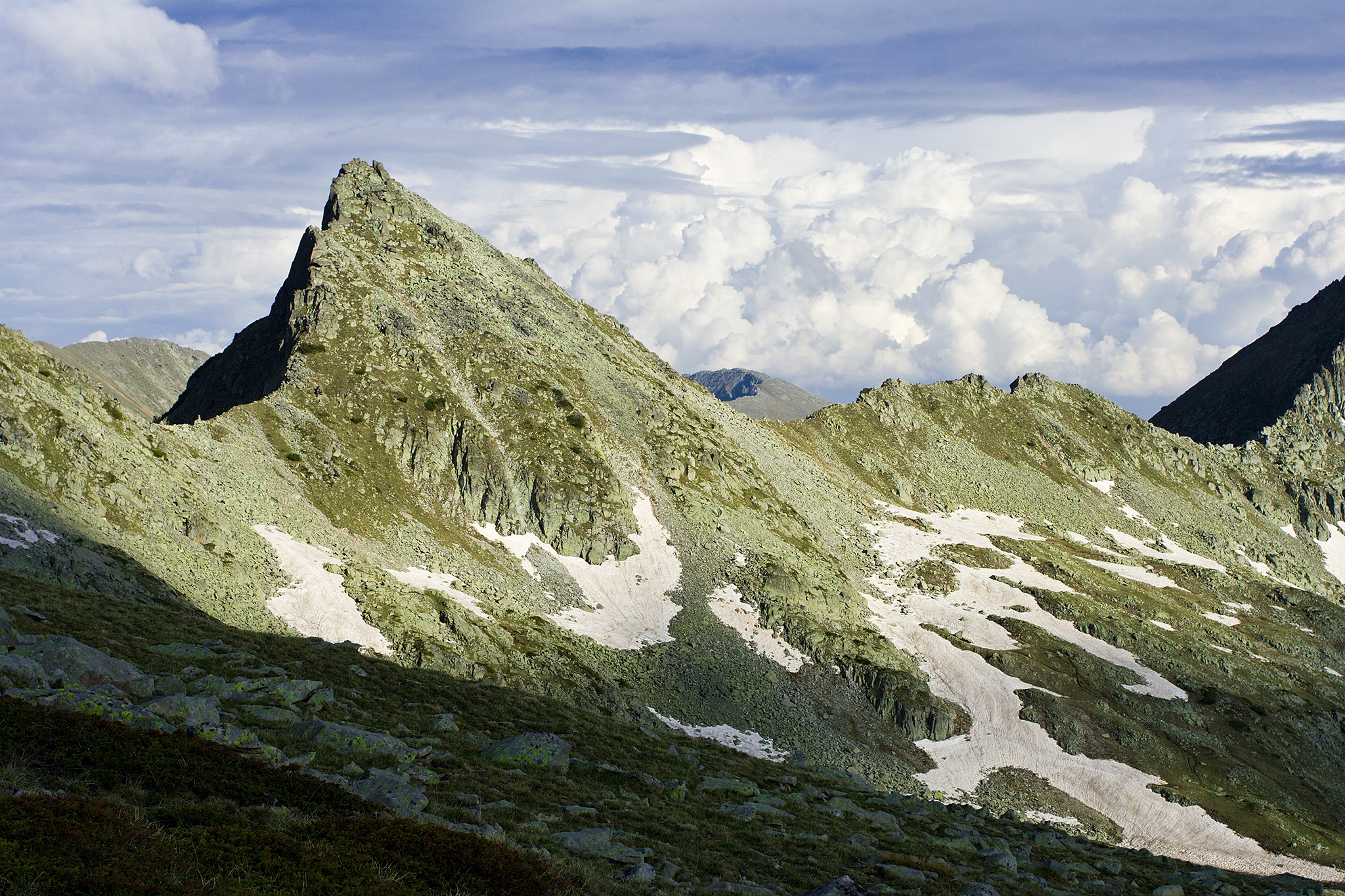

Highest point
- Elevation: 2,680 m (8,790 ft)
- Coordinates: 41°41′46″N 23°29′37″E

Geography
- Location: Blagoevgrad Province, Bulgaria
- Parent range: Pirin Mountains

Kralev Dvor (Bulgarian: Кралев двор) is a 2,680 m high peak in the Pirin mountain range, south-western Bulgaria. It is located on the southern part of the main mountain ridge. It is a pyramidal peak formed by cirque erosion by the glaciers in the cirques of Demir Kapia, Kralev Dvor and Belemeto. Seen from Tevnoto Lake, it has a triangular shape leaning in north-northwestern direction. To the north is located another massive pyramid-shaped summit, Momin Dvor (2,723 m). The two peaks are connected via an easily accessible saddle on the main path between the Bezbog refuge and Tevnoto Lake shelter. To the south the Kamenitsa secondary ridge stems from the main mountain ridge with the summits of Malka Kamenitsa and Kamenitsa Peak (2,822 m).
