= Malokamenishki Lakes =

Group of lakes in Bulgaria

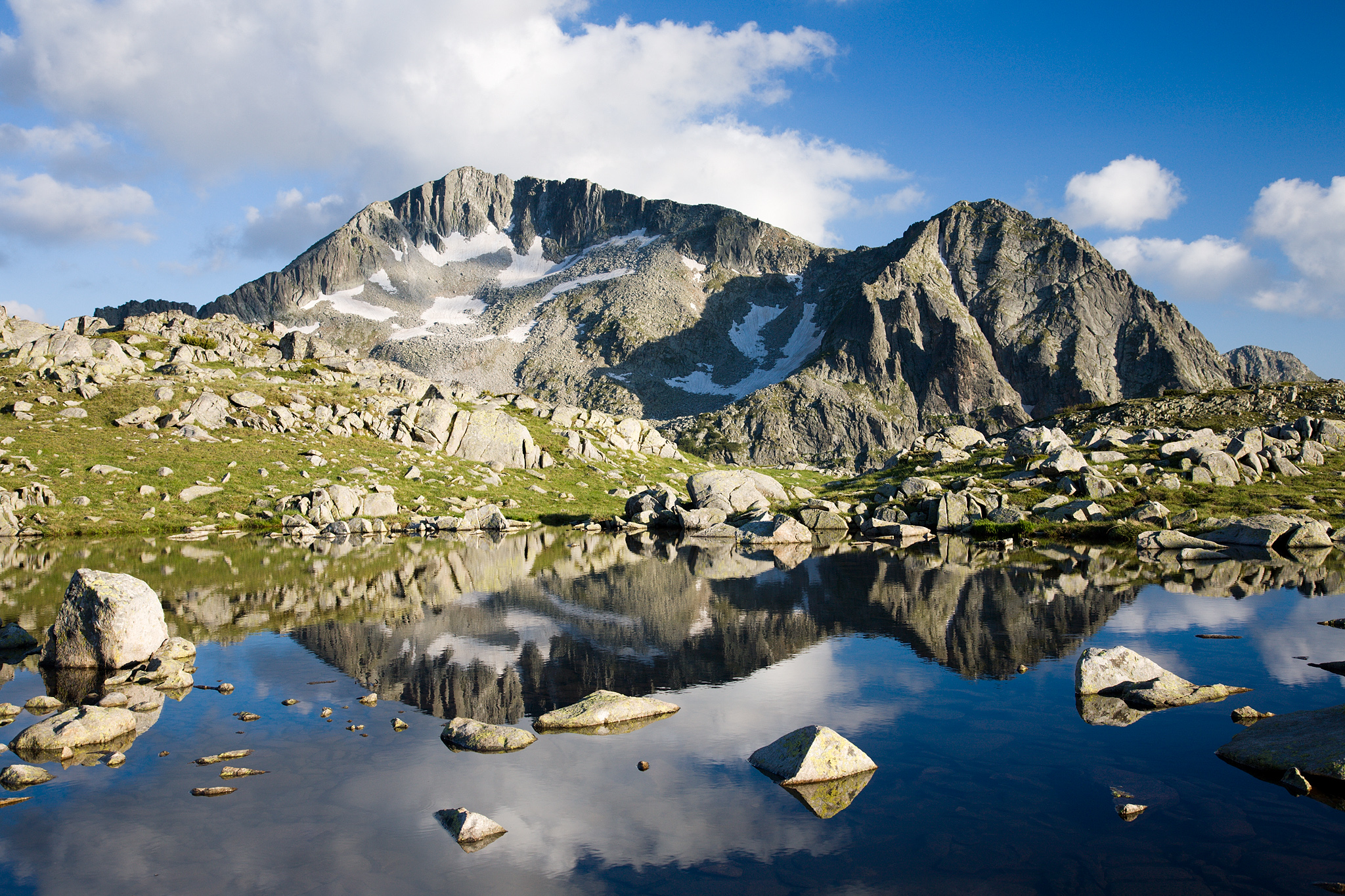

- Location within Bulgaria
- Coordinates: 41°42′0″N 23°28′47″E
- Basin countries: Bulgaria
- Max. depth: 3.9 m (13 ft)
- Surface elevation: 2,190 m (7,190 ft) to 2,537 m (8,323 ft)

Malokamenishki Lakes (Bulgarian: Малокаменишки езера), also known as Belemetski Lakes (Белеметски езера), are a group of 34 glacial lakes situated southwest of the main ridge of Pirin mountain range in Bulgaria. They are the source area of the river Mozgovitsa, one of the tributaries of the Sandanska Bistritsa of the Struma river basin. The lake group is located in the Belemeto cirque, flanked by the main mountain ridge and the secondary ridges of Kamenitsa and Mozgovitsa, crowned by the summits of Kamenitsa Peak (2,822 m), Kralev Dvor (2,680 m), Momin Dvor (2,723 m) and Valyavishki Chukar (2,664 m).

== Lakes ==
Malokamenishki Lakes are among the largest lake groups in Pirin by number. They are situated at altitudes between 2,537 m and 2,190 m. Two of the lakes have an area of over 10,000 m^{2}, seven between 1,000 and 10,000 m^{2} and the rest under 1,000 m^{2}. Most of them are swallow and dry out in summer. The highest eleven lakes are scattered in the folds of the Belemeto cirque centered around the eight lake, Tevnoto. Most of them have unreliable water flow and an area under 1,000 m^{2}.

Tevnoto Lake is the largest and northernmost of the group, located in the immediate vicinity of the summits of Momin Dvor and Valyavishki Chukar. It has an elongated curved shape slightly resembling a kidney. Reaching length of 487 m, width of 220 m and area of 62,490 m^{2}, it is the eight largest lake in the mountain range and largest one in Bulgaria above 2,500 m. Its exact altitude is 2,519 m, which makes it the sixteenth highest lake in Pirin. The depth is 3.9 m; the water volume is 116,570 m^{3}. The homonymous Tevno Ezero shelter is situated near the out-flowing stream to the south. Its natural beauty and majestic surroundings of rugged peaks make it a popular tourist destination.

Lakes twelve to twenty-three are located along the southern slope of Belemeto at the foothills of the summit of Kamenitsa. The largest are lakes 12, 13, 15, 17 and 22. They are heterogeneous in character. Some have a non-permanent water flow, most are marshy, with sloping grass banks. An exception is lake 22 on the northern slopes of Kamenitsa at an altitude of 2375 m, which is the second largest in the lake group with an area of 13,950 m^{2}, maximum depth of 2.3 m and a volume of 11,500 m^{3}. It has rocky shores and rocky bottom.

Lakes twenty-four to thirty-four are located in the Mozgovitsa area at an altitude below 2,230 m. Most of them are remnants of an already filled larger lake. Most are very small, under 1,000 m^{2}. There are also several lakes that have disappeared with time.

== Gallery ==
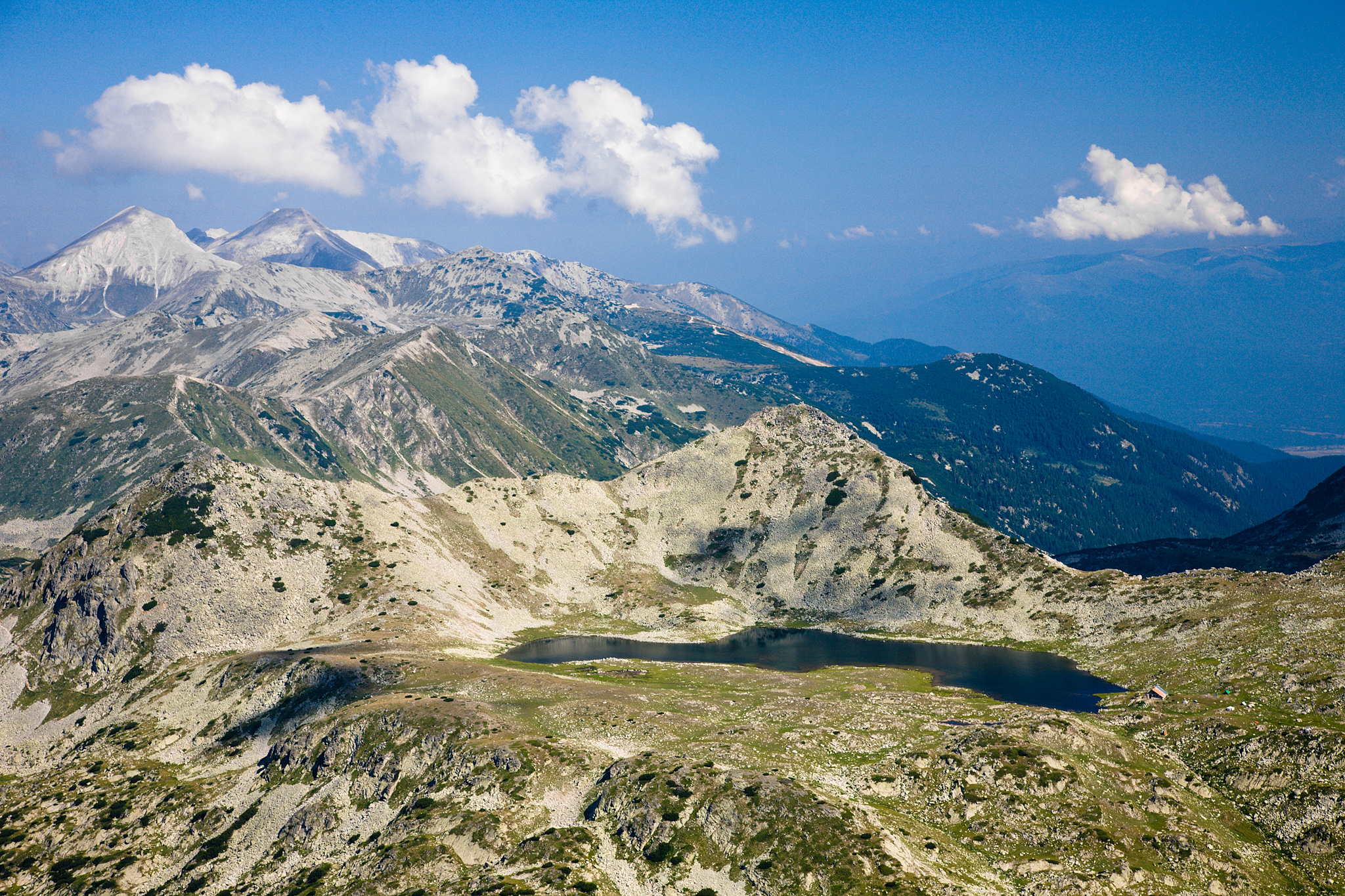

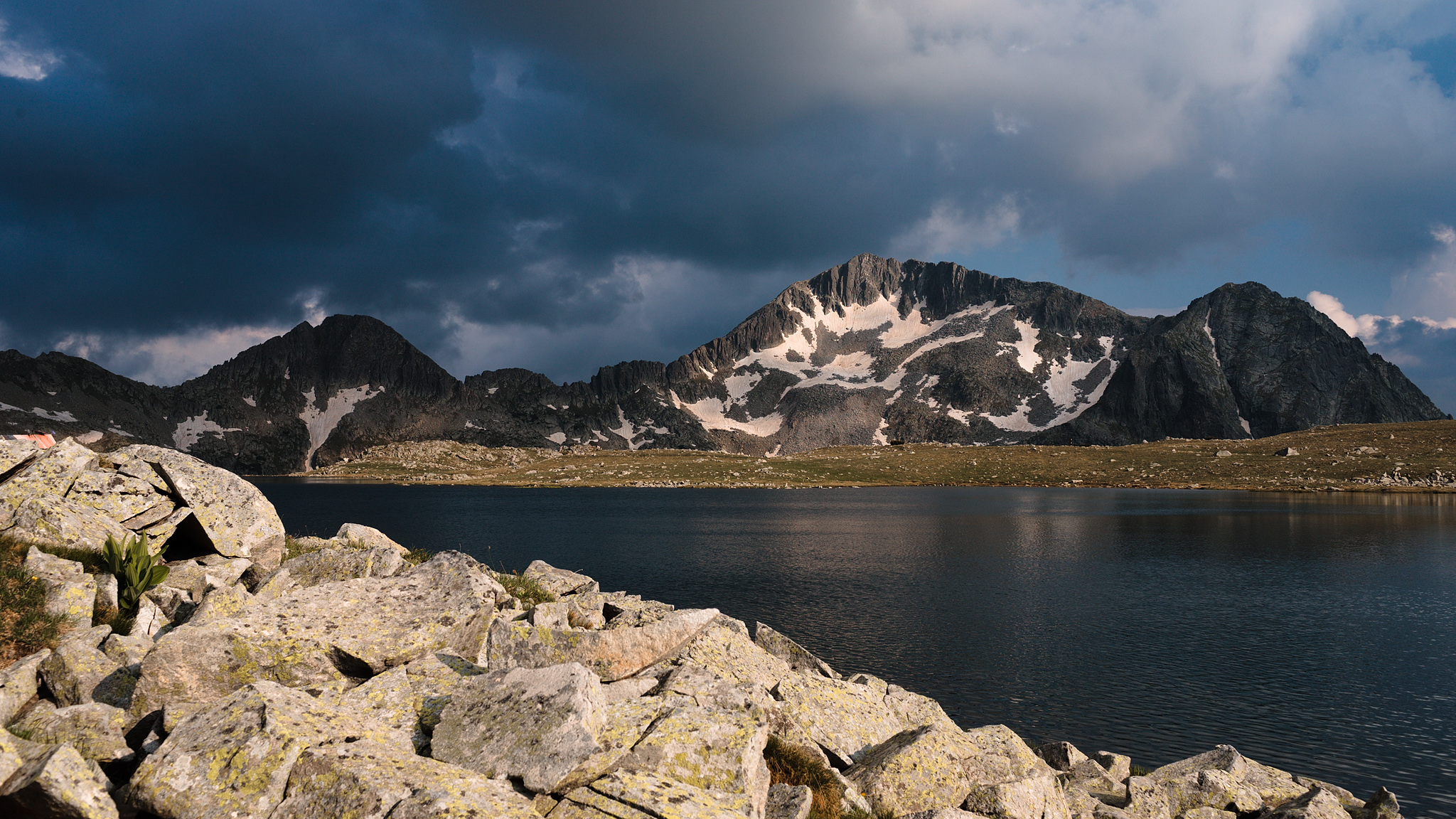

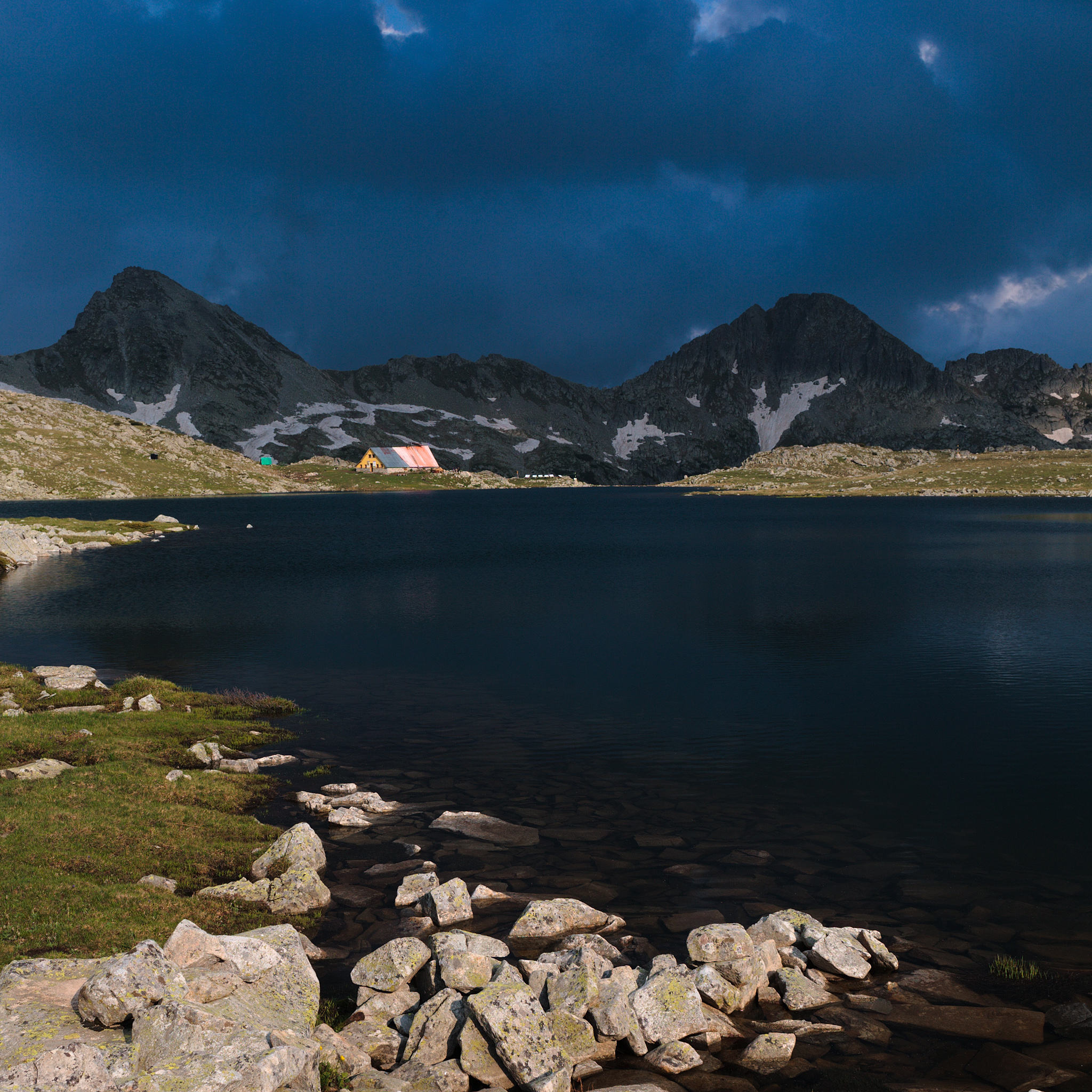

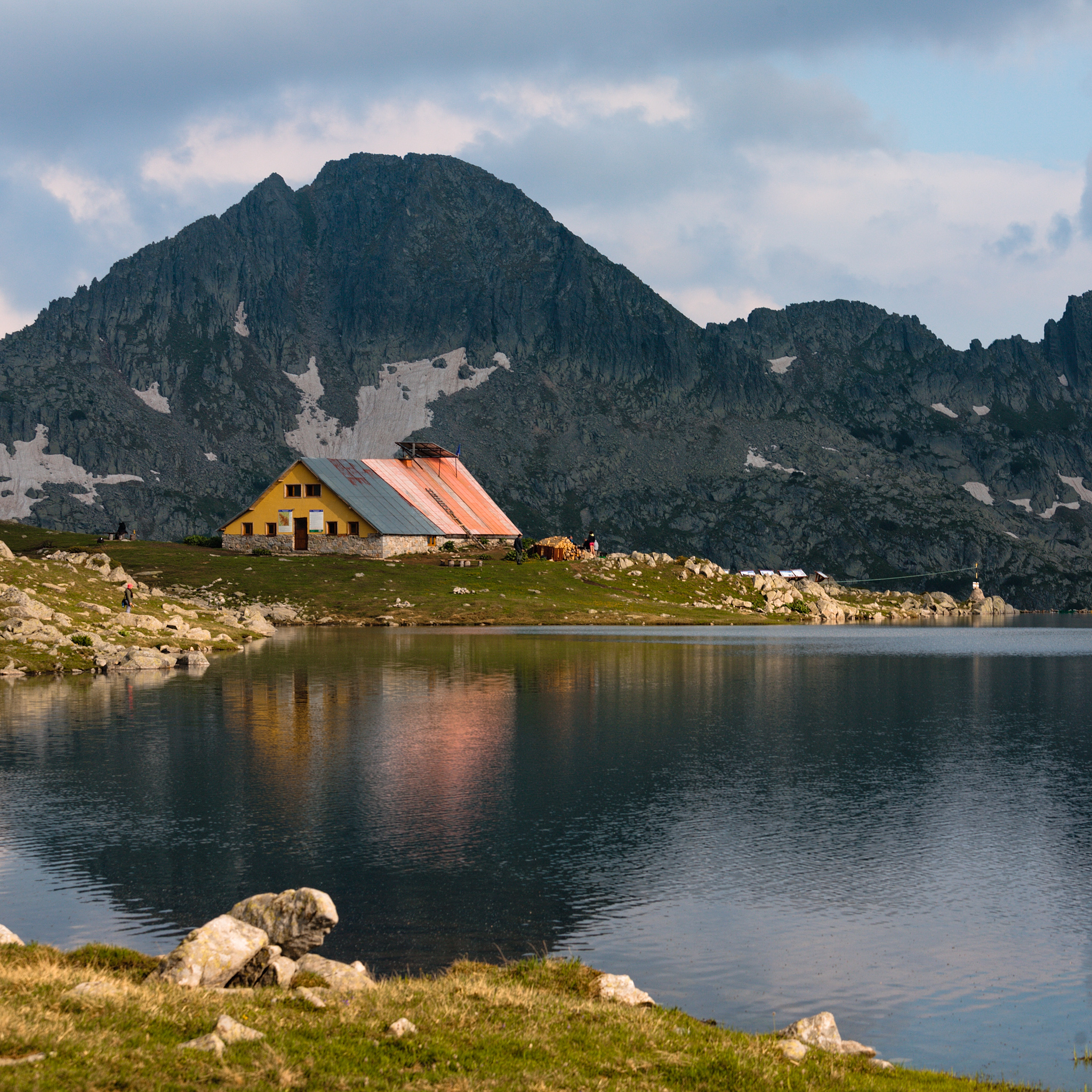

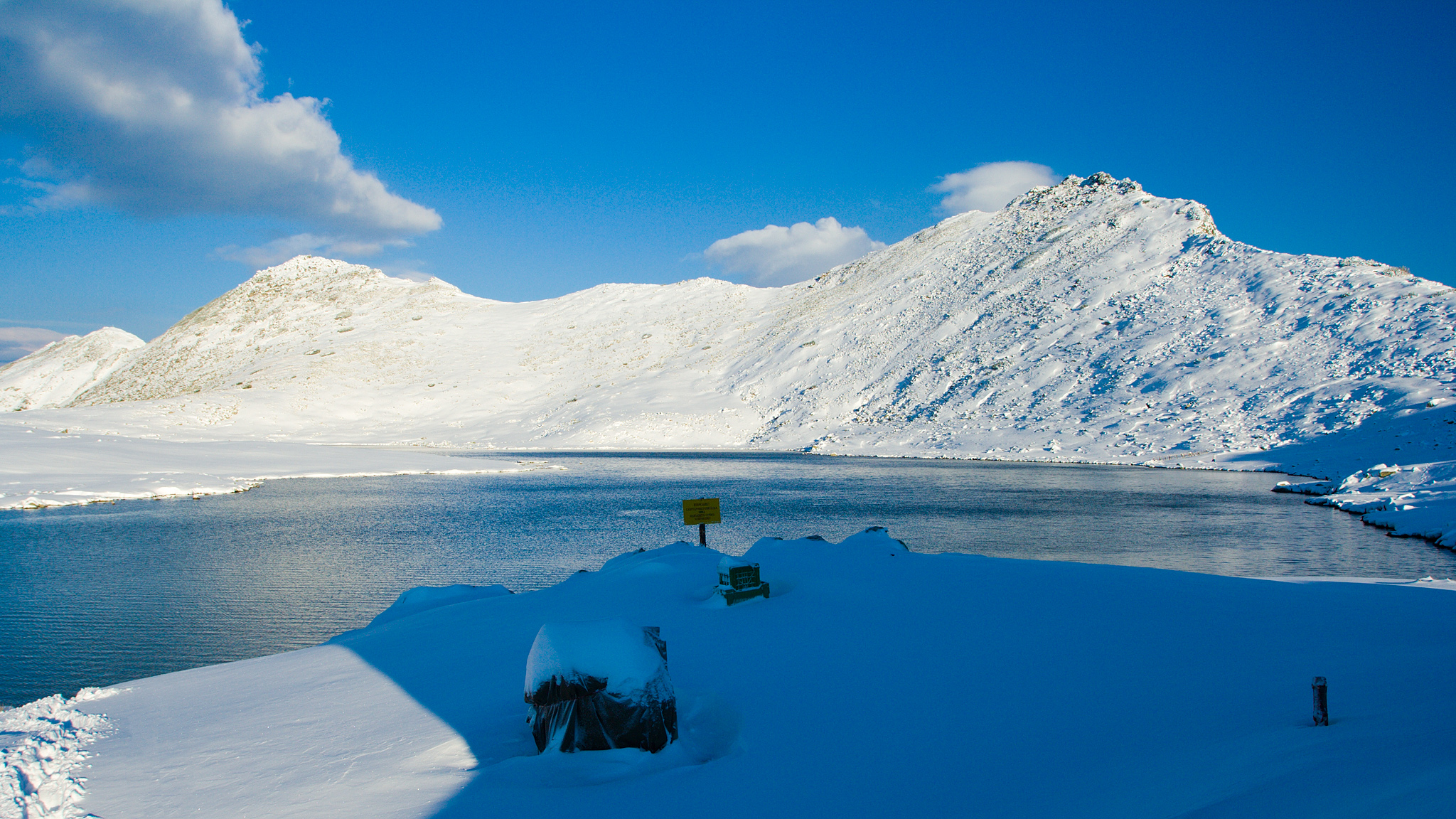
