= Valyavishki Lakes =

Group of lakes in southwestern Bulgaria

Coordinates: 41.710°N 23.483°E

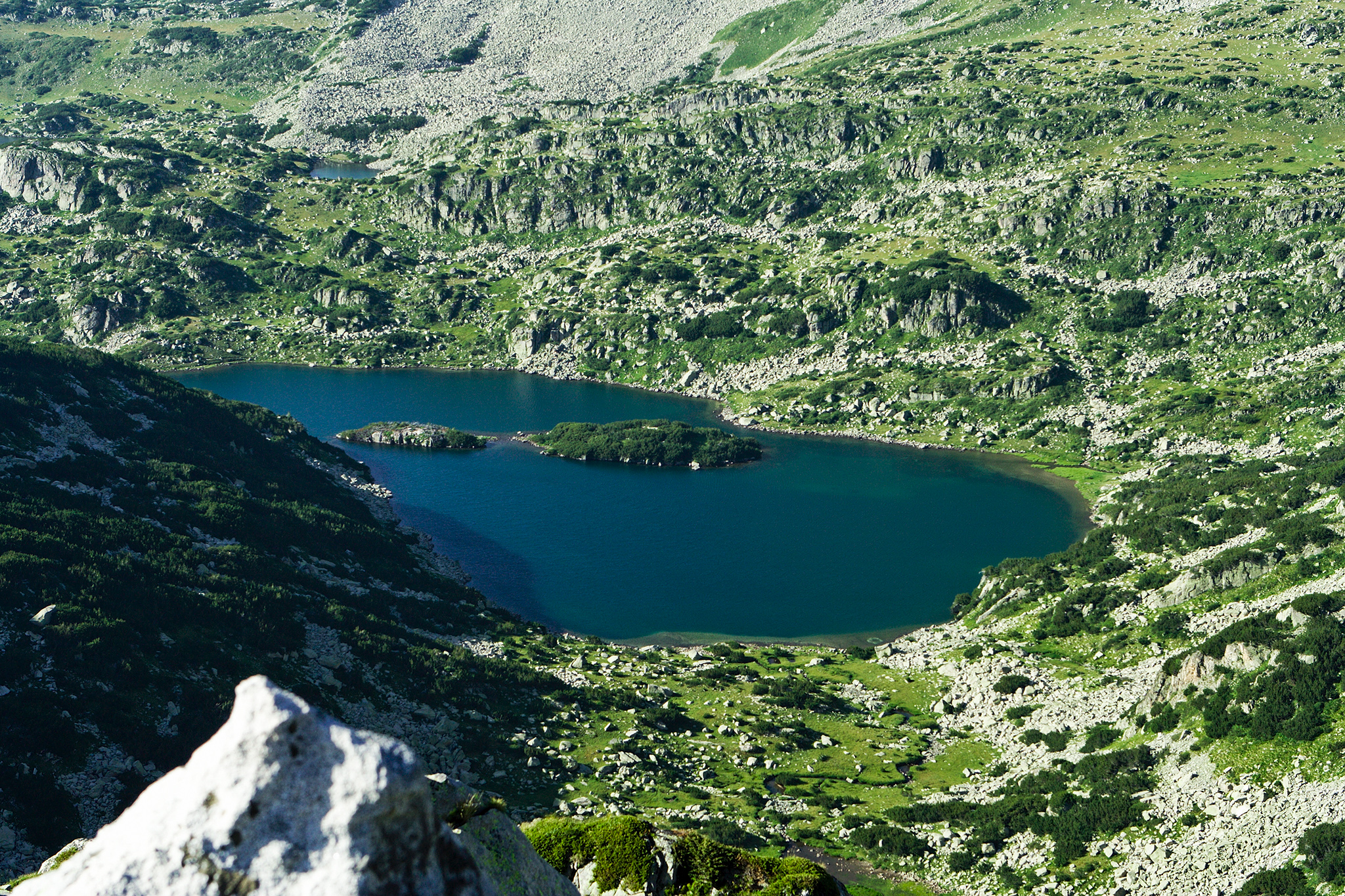
The Big Lake.

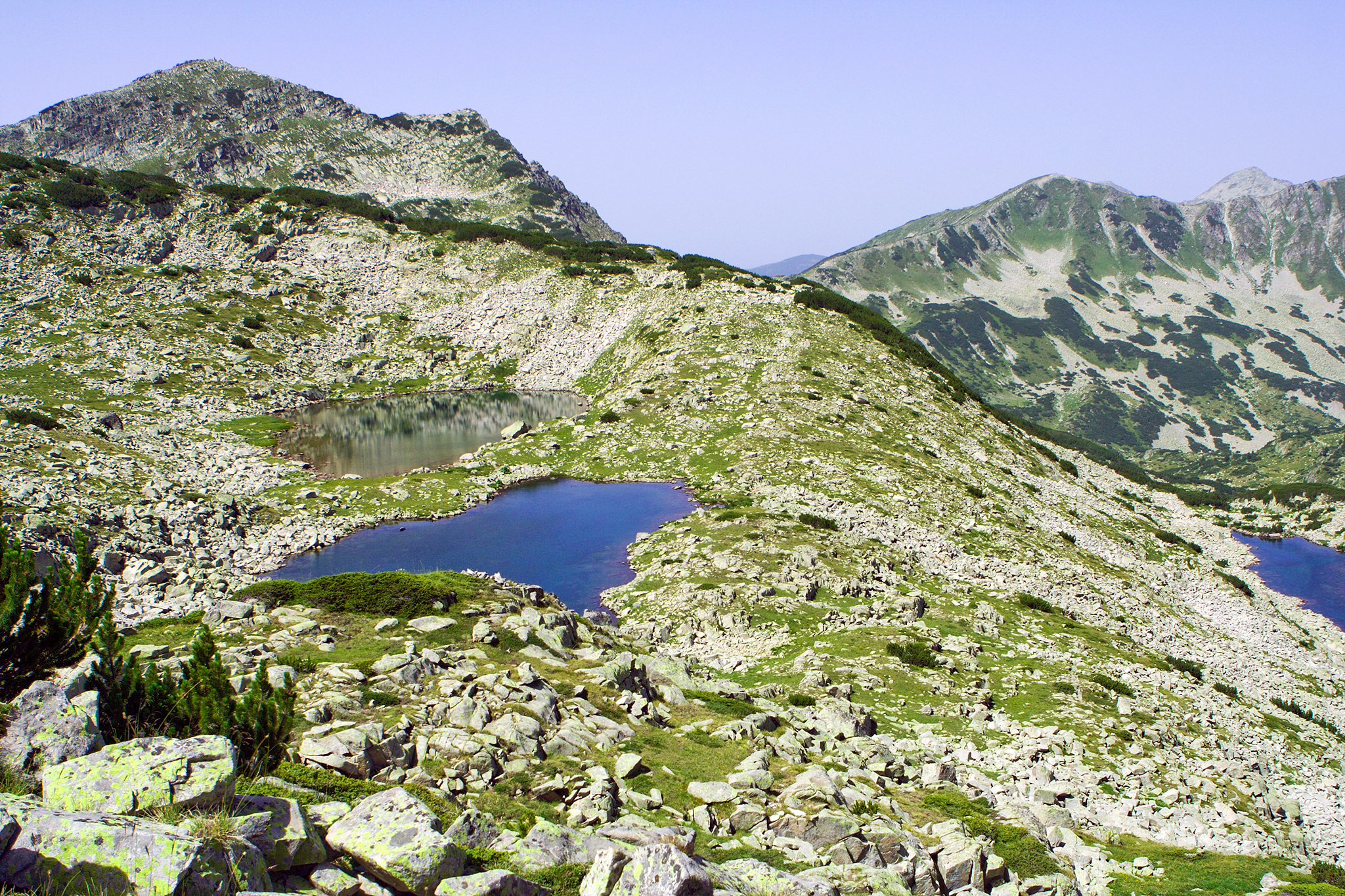
The two highest lakes under the Dzhengal peak.

The Valyavishki Lakes (Bulgarian: Валявишки езера) is a group of lakes in the northern part of the Pirin National Park in southwestern Bulgaria and includes 10 lakes. They are situated in the cirque of the same name. The lakes are glacial and lie on a granite bed. They are located between 2,300 and 2,475 m. Their shores are steep and rocky. The higher lakes drain into the lower ones due to their step-like situation. Pine-scrub grows around the lakes.

Trout are abundant in the waters. There have been attempts to introduce Brook trout into the lakes.

The group is the source of the Valyavitsa river which is a main tributary to the Demyanitsa river.

The largest lake by area is the Big Lake which is located at an altitude of 2379 m. It is 18 m deep. The big lake is 270 m wide and 480 m long with an area of 81.5 decares. The lake is situated in the vicinity of the Valyavishki Chukar peak.

The Valyavishki lakes are among the main tourist attractions in the area. The closest hut is the Demyanitsa refuge, a 2-hour hike from the lakes.
