= Muratov Vrah =

Peak in Bulgaria

Muratov Vrah (Муратов връх)
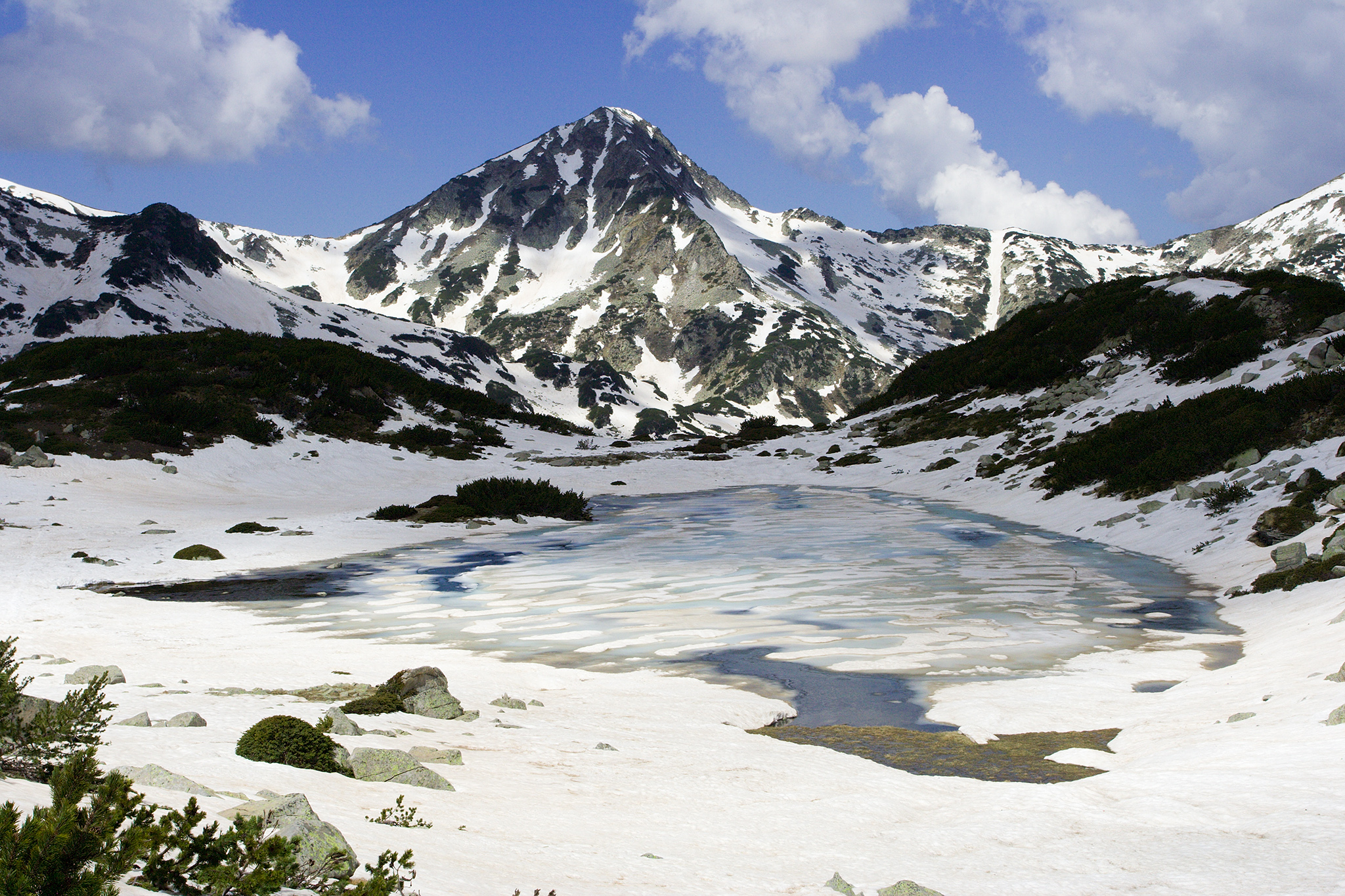

Highest point
- Elevation: 2,669 m (8,757 ft)
- Coordinates: 41°44′44.64″N 23°23′48.18″E

Geography
- Location: Blagoevgrad Province, Bulgaria
- Parent range: Pirin Mountains

Muratov Vrah (Bulgarian: Муратов връх) is a 2,669 m high peak in the Pirin mountain range, south-western Bulgaria. It is situated on the main ridge of the mountain range, to the southwest of the summit of Hvoynati Vrah (2,635 m) and to the northwest of the rocky ridge Donchovi Karauli, from which it is separated by the saddle Banderishka porta. In southwestern direction from the summit branches the Sinanitsa secondary ridge of Pirin.

Muratov Vrah is built up of granite. The peak is rocky, shaped like a four-walled pyramid, resembling Pirin's highest summit Vihren (2,914 m). Its slopes are steep; the northern and eastern slopes are popular with climbers. The summit is deforested, with isolated pockets of dwarf pine (Pinus mugo) along its foothills.

== Gallery ==
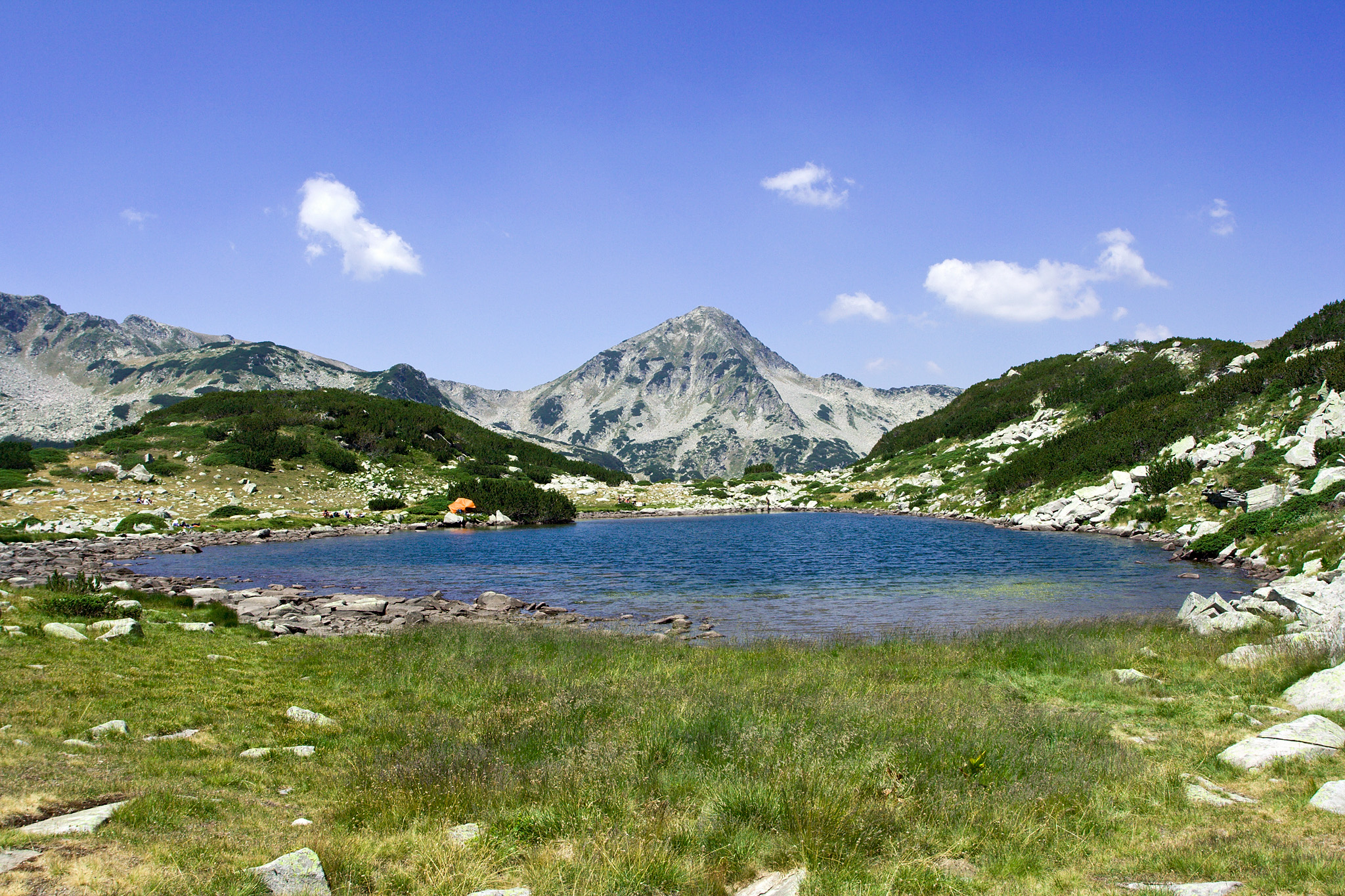

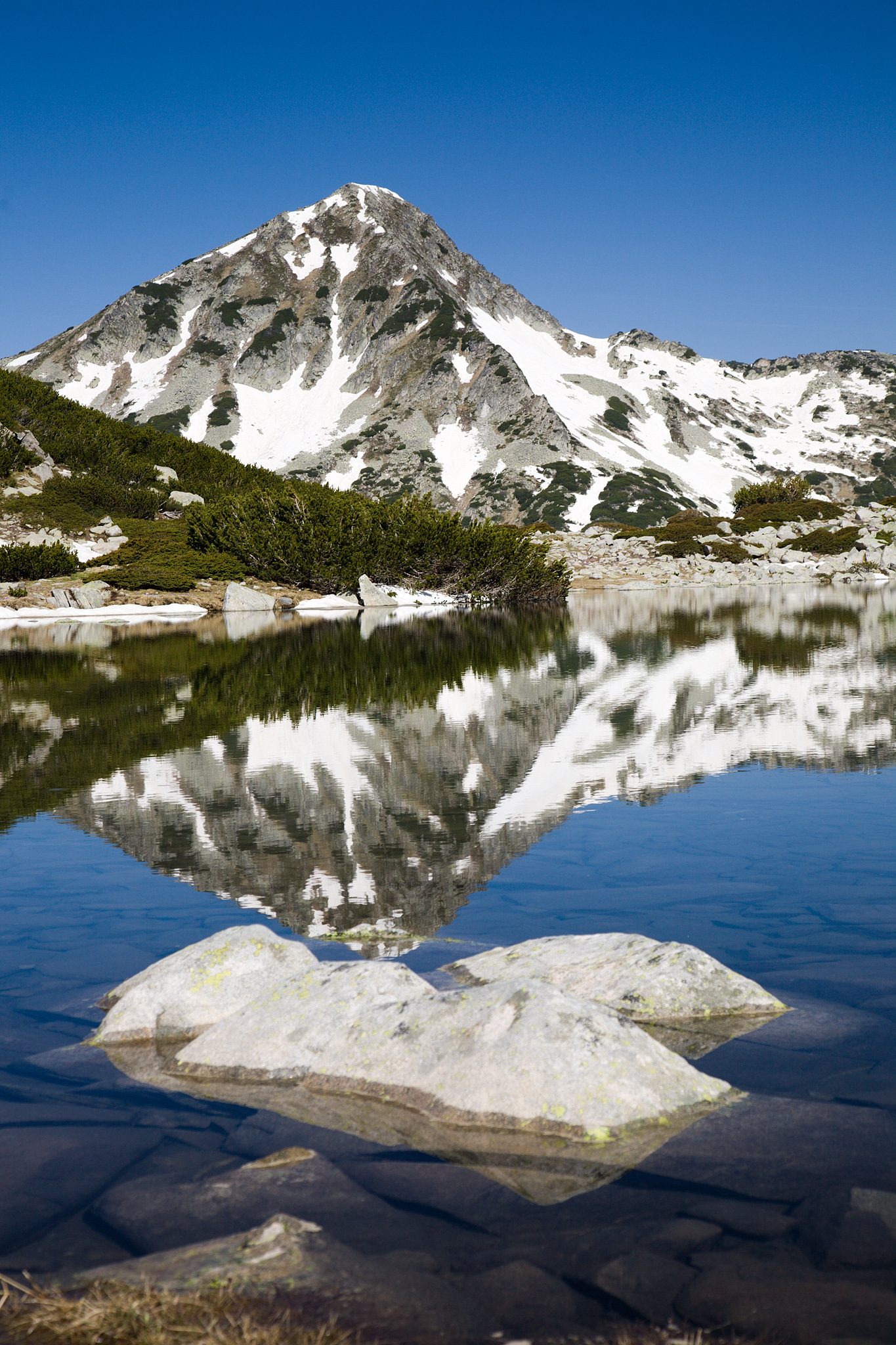

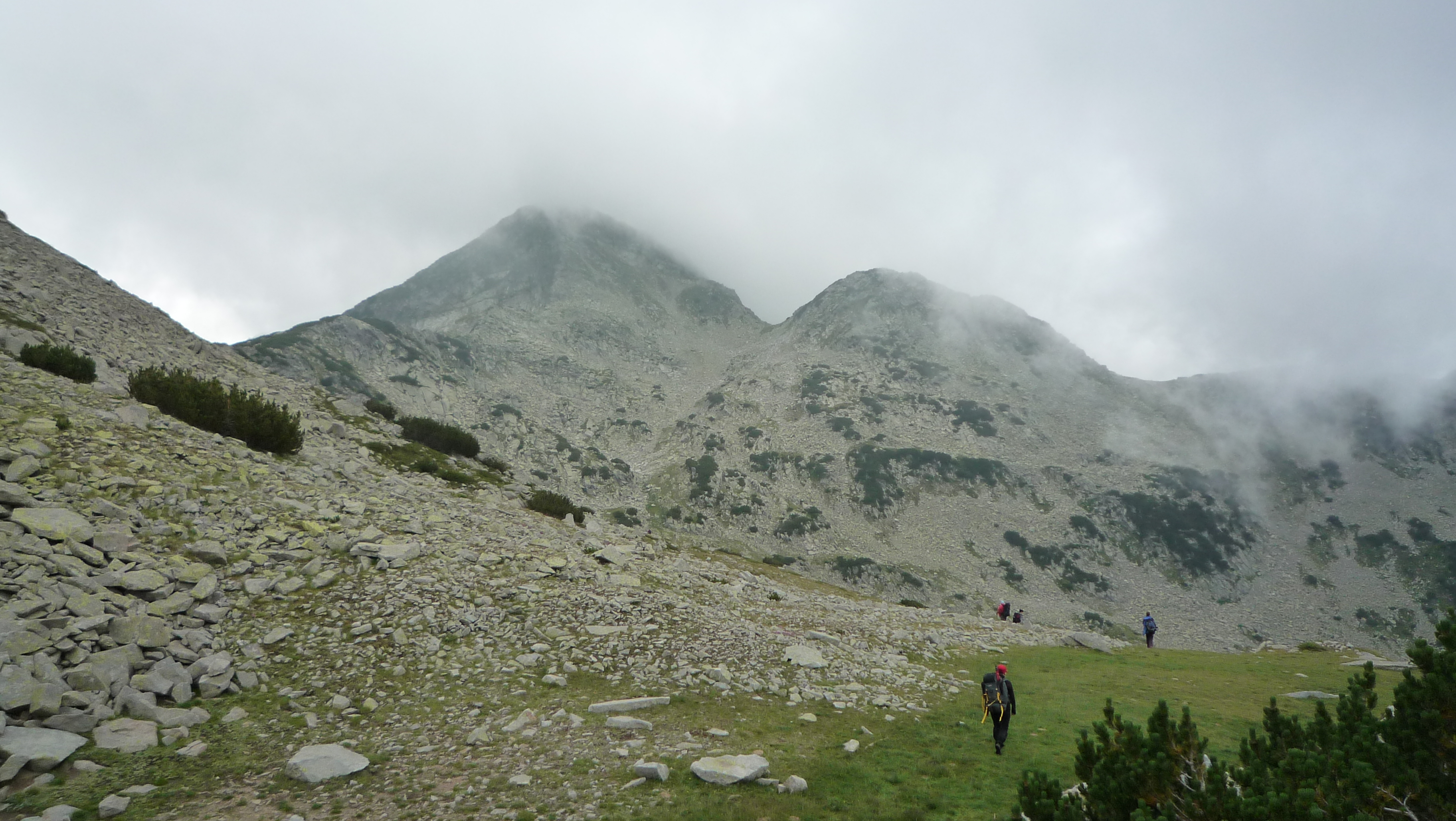
