= Valyavishki Chukar =

Bulgarian mountain peak

Valyavishki Chukar (Валявишки чукар)
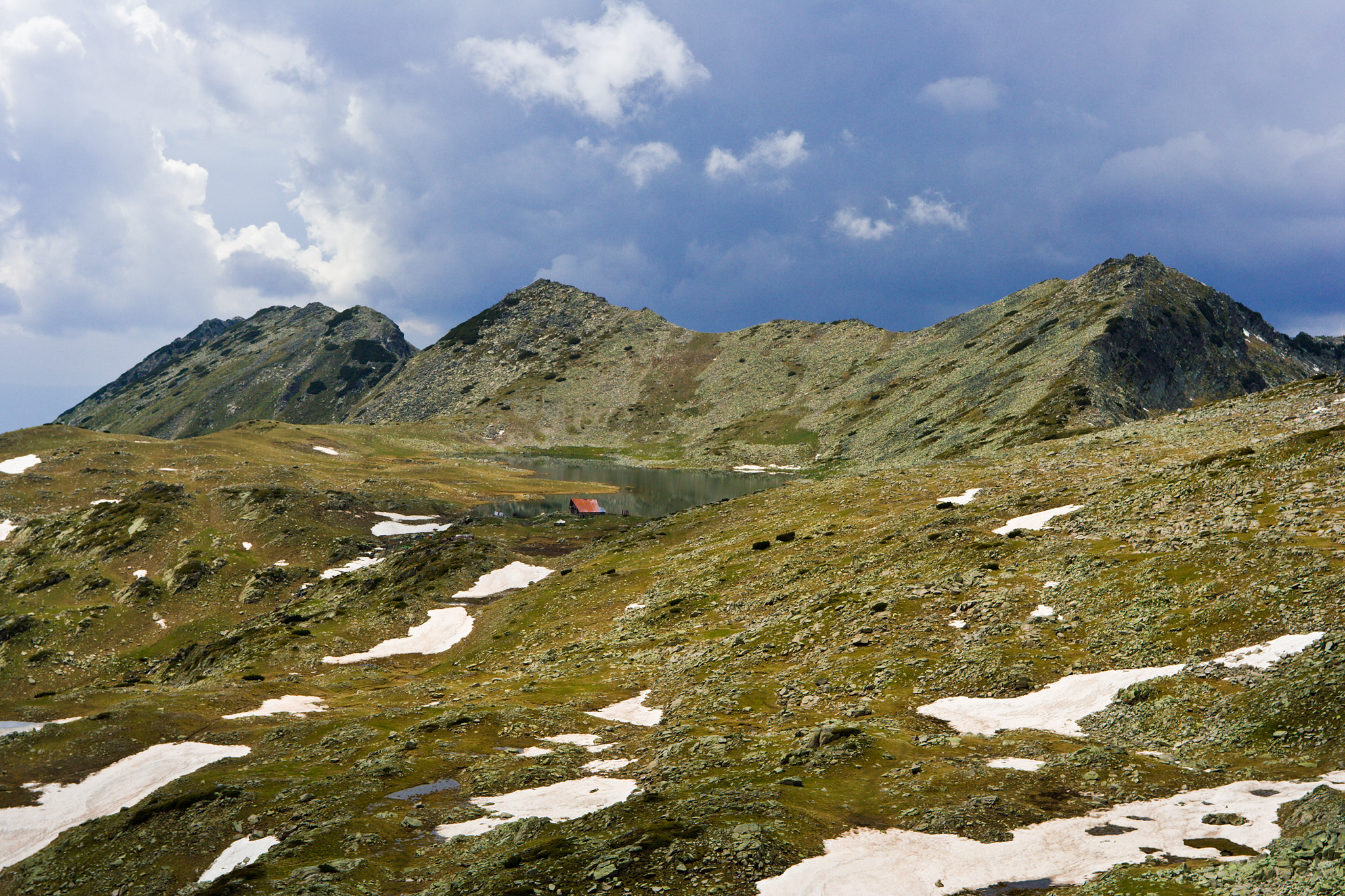

Highest point
- Elevation: 2,664 m (8,740 ft)
- Coordinates: 41°42′11″N 23°28′38″E

Geography
- Location: Blagoevgrad Province, Bulgaria
- Parent range: Pirin Mountains

Valyavishki Chukar (Bulgarian: Валявишки чукар) is a 2,664 m high peak in the Pirin mountain range, south-western Bulgaria. It is located on the northern part of the main mountain ridge at the intersection of three cirques — Belemeto, Valyavishki and Prevalski. To the southwest along the main ridge there is a lower unnamed summit linked with a shallow rugged saddle as seen from the Tevno Lake. To the southwest is the saddle Mozgovishka Porta, where the main trails from the Demyanitsa refuge to the Tevno Lake pass through.

On the northern slope of Valyavishki Chukar there are two massive rock edges, covered with large granite blocks and overgrown at places with dwarf mountain pine (Pinus mugo). One of the edges descends from the summit in northwestern direction, forming the limits of the Prevalski cirque from the east. The other edge descends in the northeastern direction and reaches directly the shores of the largest of the Valyavishki Lakes.

To the east of Valyavishki Chukar, the main ridge descends sharply in the direction of the neighbouring summit of Momin Dvor (2,723 m). The southeastern slopes of Valyavishki Chukar are covered with a granite blocks that reach the shores of the Tevno Lake. To the west is the summit of Prevalski Chukar (2,605 m).

The summit is easily from the east. The climb from the trails starting from the Tevno Ezero shelter is about 20 minutes.

== See also ==
- List of mountain peaks in Pirin
- List of mountains in Bulgaria
- List of mountains of the Balkans
