= Kamenitsa Peak (Pirin) =

Bulgarian mountain peak

Kamenitsa (Каменица)
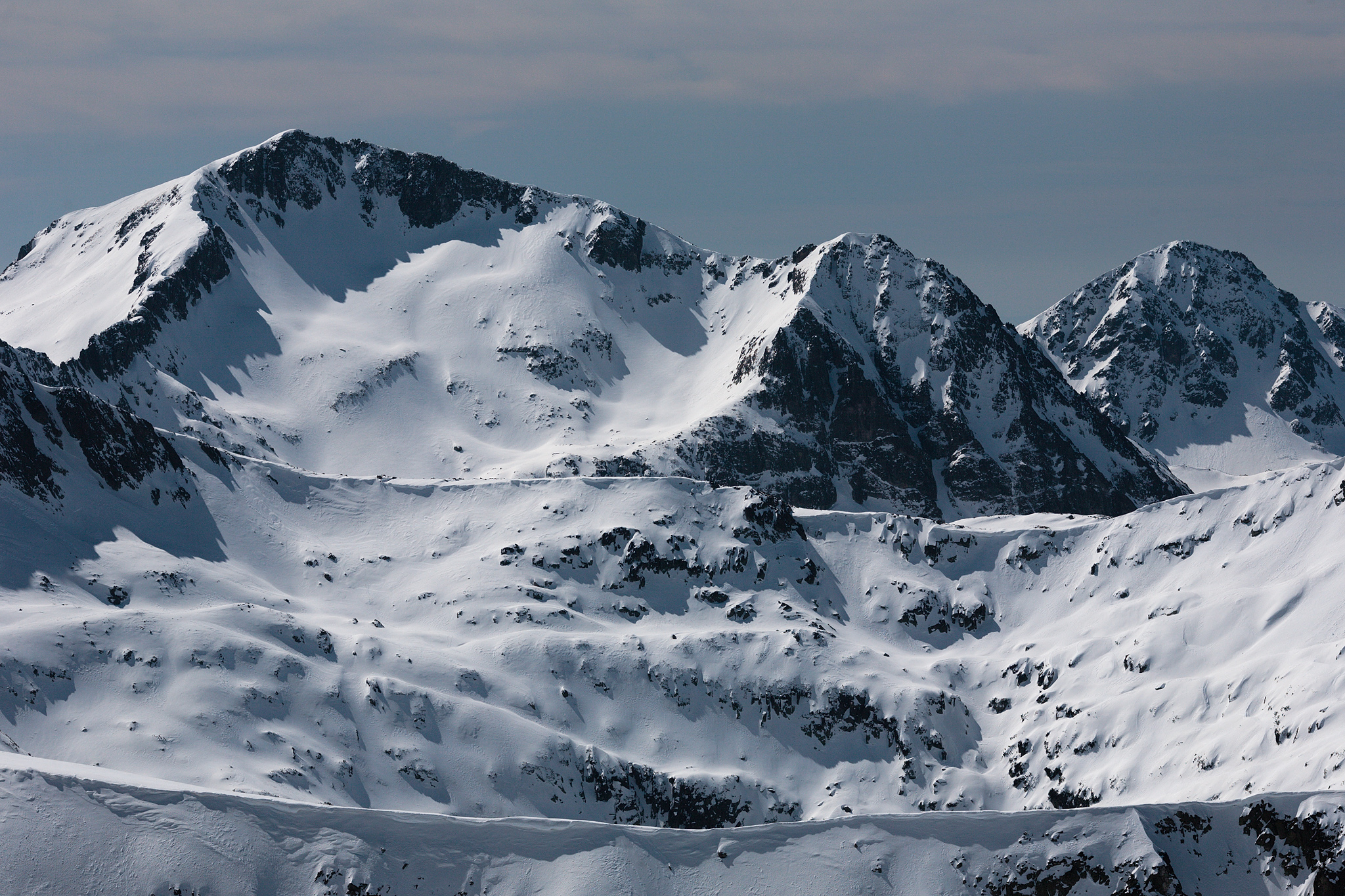
- A view of Kamenitsa in winter

Highest point
- Elevation: 2,822 m (9,259 ft)
- Coordinates: 41°41′03.83″N 23°29′18.04″E

Geography
- Location: Blagoevgrad Province, Bulgaria
- Parent range: Pirin Mountains

Kamenitsa (Bulgarian: Каменица [ˈkamɛnit͡sɐ]) is a peak in the Pirin mountain range, south-western Bulgaria. It is located in the northern part of Pirin on the 22 km-long Kamenitsa secondary ridge between the summits of Malka Kamenitsa to the north and Yalovarnika (2,763 m) to the south. Its height is 2,822 m which ranks it on fifth place in Pirin, behind Vihren (2,914 m), Kutelo (2,908 m), Banski Suhodol (2,884 m) and Polezhan (2,851 m). The peak is built up of granite blocks covered in lichens.

A short ridge stems form the summit in western direction, ending with rocky slopes known as the Kamenitsa doll. It is with the Kamenitsa doll that Kamenitsa acquires its characteristic and very popular silhouette seen from Tevnoto Lake. To the south is situated the long Begovishki ridge that separates the valleys of the rivers Begovitsa and Mozgovitsa. To the north the summit is rugged with prominent pointy peak. Below the steep rocks there is a large field of moraines which give the name of the peak. On the northern face there is a climbing tour of category II "b". To the south the peak is rocky but less oblique and imposing.

Kamenitsa is accessible from the Begovitsa and Pirin refuges, as well as from the Tevno ezero shelter. There are no marked tourist paths leading to the summit but the views from the top are among the most impressive in Pirin.

== Gallery ==
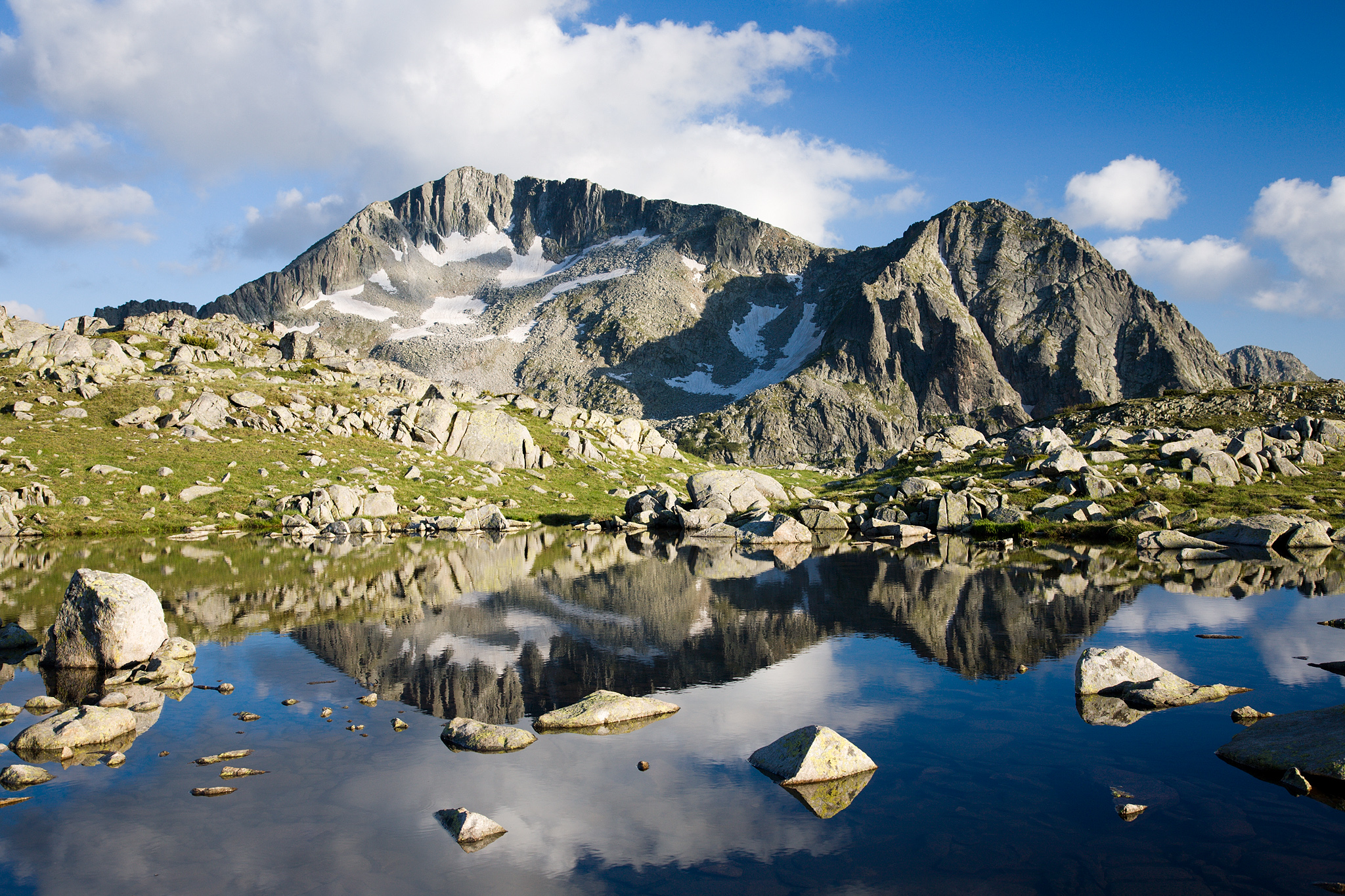

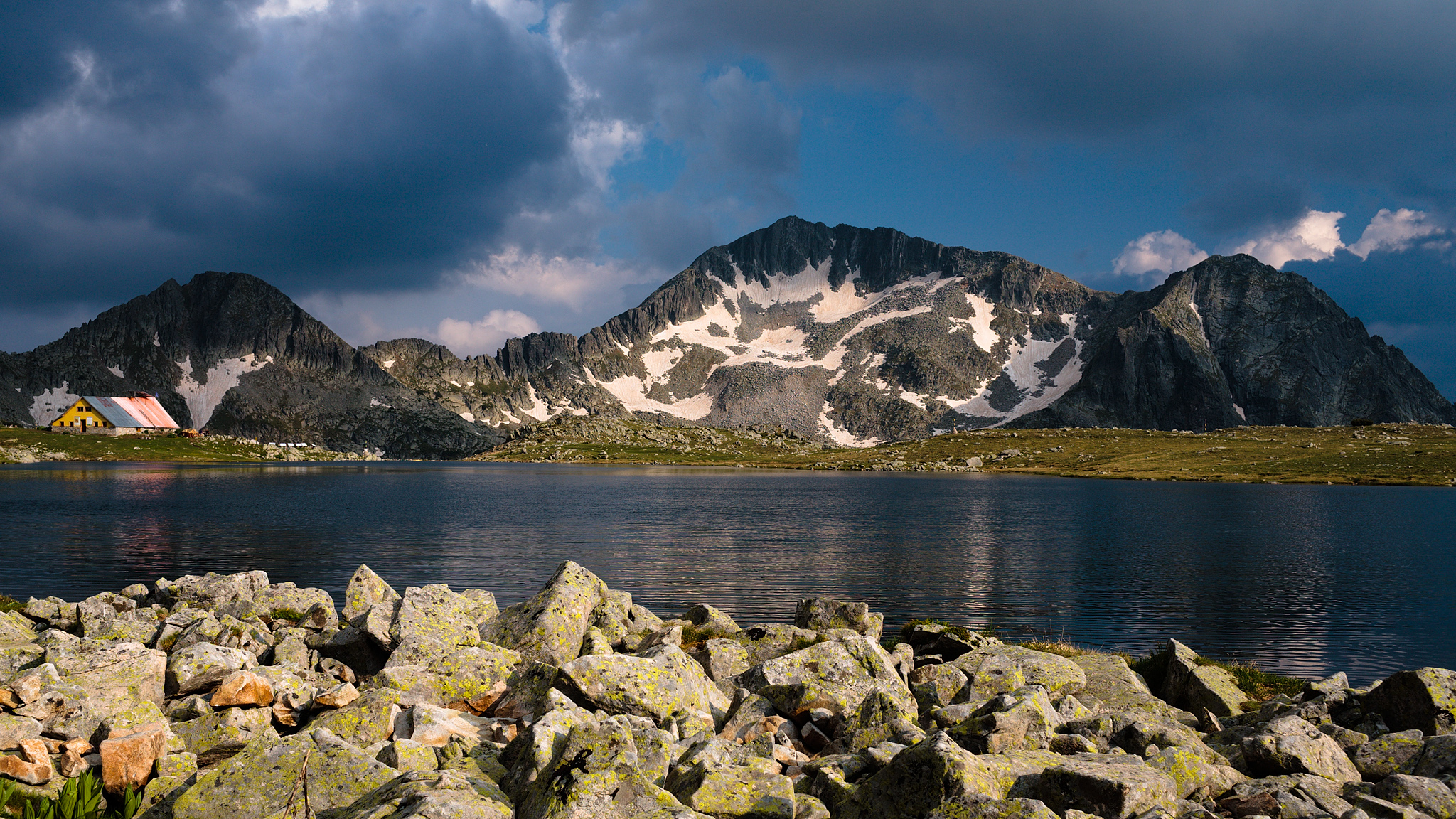

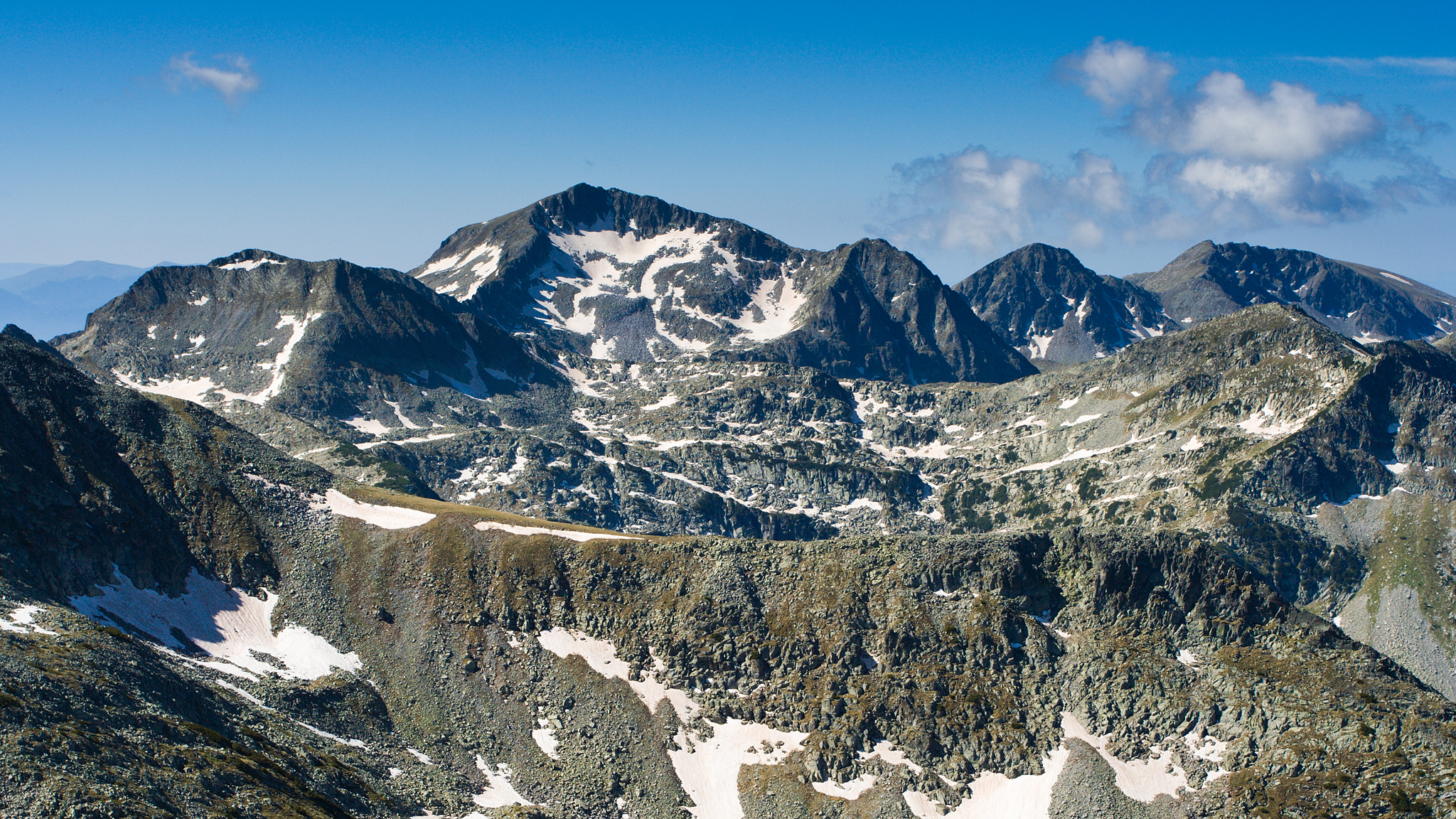

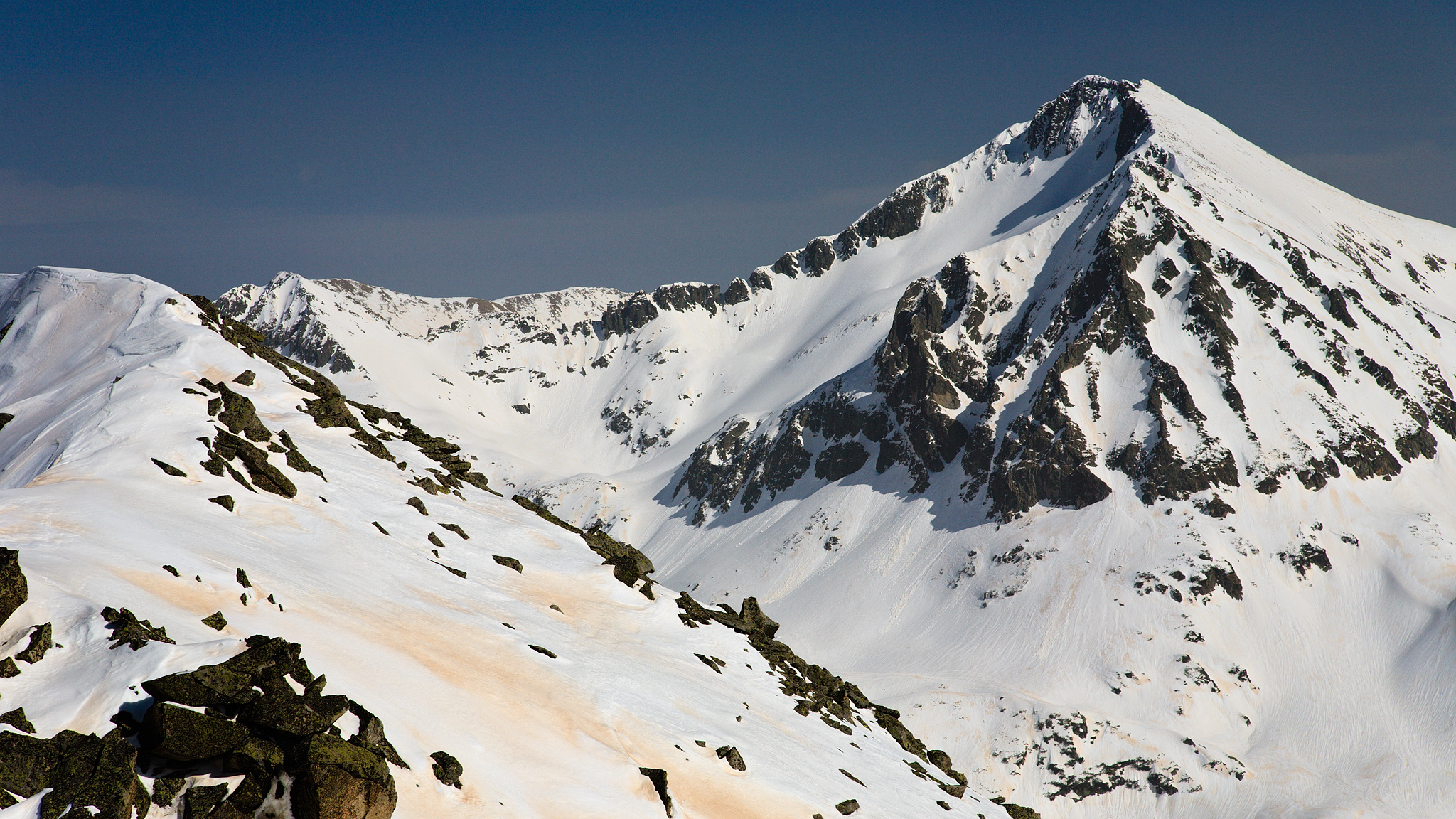
