= List of lakes of Bulgaria =

This is an incomplete list of lakes of Bulgaria.

Image	Lake	Area (km^{2})	Depth (m)
	Limans and lagoons		
	Lake Atanasovsko	17	1
	Lake Beloslav	4-10	14
	Lake Burgas	27.6	31
	Lake Durankulak	4	
	Lake Pomorie	8.5	1,4
	Lake Shabla	0.8	4
	Lake Varna	17	19
	Swamps, marshes and other lakes		
	Aldomirovtsi Marsh	1.29	
	Alepu	1.67	
	Arkutino		
	Dragoman Marsh	4	
	Lake Rabisha		15
	Smolyan lakes (8 lakes)		4,5
	Srebarna	2	3
	Ustren lake	0.15	
	Glacial lakes (in Pirin)		
	Banderishki Lakes (17 lakes)	0.13	12
	Bashliiski Lakes (4 lakes)	0.02	3
	Breznishki Lakes (3 lakes)	0.04	
	Chairski Lakes (9 lakes)	0.09	5,6
	Dautovo Lake		
	Kremenski Lakes (5 lakes)	0.20	27
	Malokamenishki Lakes (20 lakes)		
	Popovo Lake	0.12	27,5
	Prevalski Lakes (4 lakes)		5,2
	Samodivski Lakes (3 lakes)	0.06	
	Tipitski Lakes (2 lakes)	0.02	9
	Valyavishki Lakes (10 lakes)		18
	Vasilashki Lakes (12 lakes)	0.16	29
	Vlahini Lakes (5 lakes)	0.09	13,4
	Glacial lakes (in Rila)		
	Lake of Purity		
	Marichini Lakes (2 lakes)	0.03	11
	Seven Rila Lakes (7 lakes)		
	1. The Eye	0.068	37,5
	2. The Fish Lake	0.035	2,5
	3. The Kidney	0.085	28
	4. The Lower Lake	0.059	11
	5. The Tear	0.007	4,5
	6. The Trefoil	0.026	6,5
	7. The Twin	0.091	27,5
	Urdini Lakes (6 lakes)		7,6
	Vapski Lakes (2 lakes)	0,03	

== See also ==
- List of reservoirs and dams in Bulgaria
- List of rivers of Bulgaria
