= Yulen =

Nature reserve in south-western Bulgaria

Yulen Nature Reserve
- IUCN category Ia (strict nature reserve)
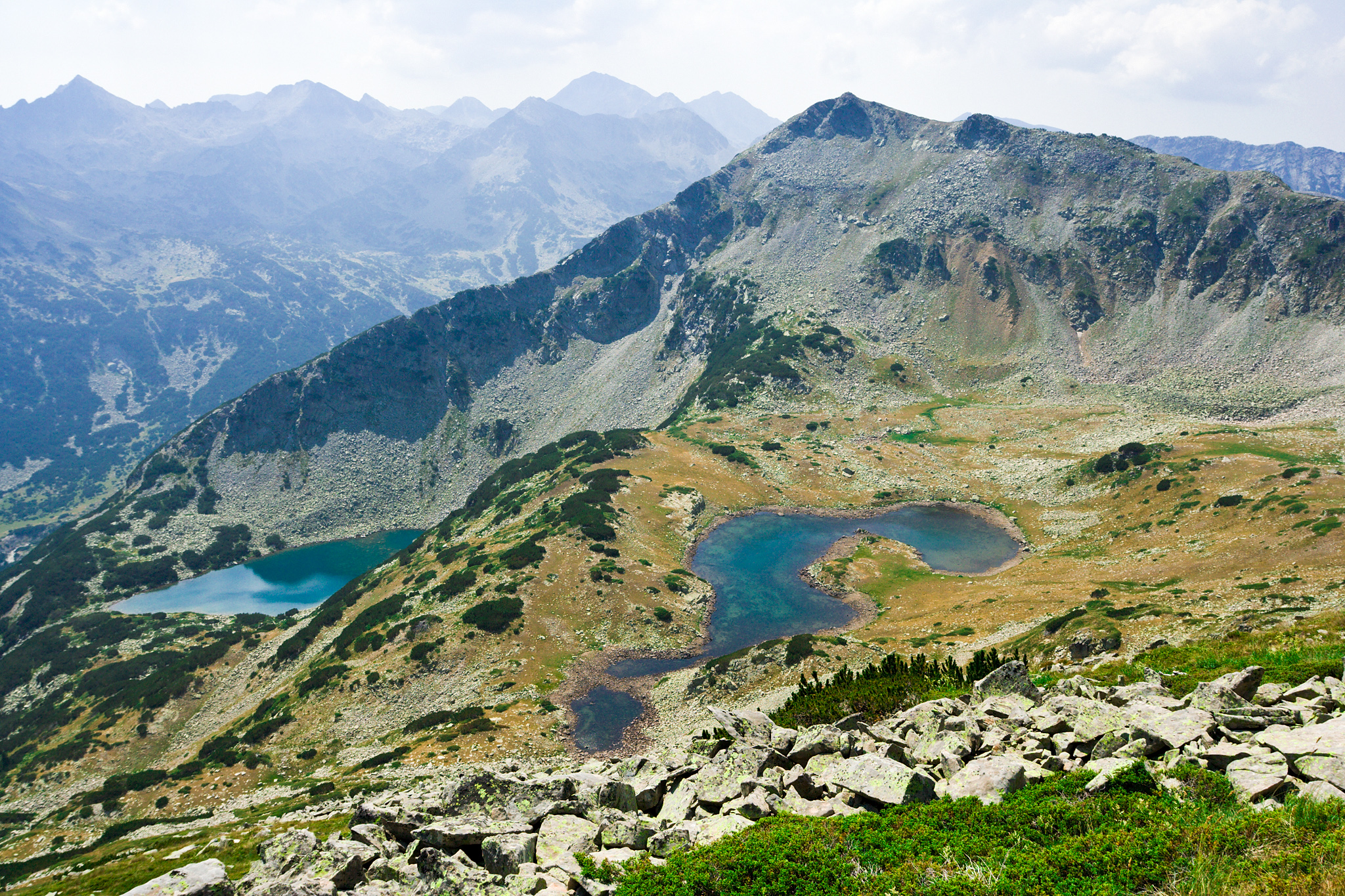

- Location within Bulgaria
- Interactive map of Yulen Nature Reserve
- Location: Bansko Municipality, Blagoevgrad Province, Bulgaria
- Nearest city: Bansko
- Coordinates: 41°45′16″N 23°28′20″E
- Area: 31.56 km^{2} (12.19 sq mi)
- Established: 26 August 1994
- Governing body: Ministry of Environment and Water

Yulen (Bulgarian: Юлен) is a nature reserve in Pirin National Park, located in the homonymous mountain range in south-western Bulgaria. It is situated in Bansko Municipality, Blagoevgrad Province. Yulen was declared on 26 August 1994 to monitor the growth of alpine plant species without human influence, as well as to protect rare plant and animal species. It spans a territory of 3156 ha or 31.56 km^{2}.

== Geographic overview ==
Yulen is situated at an altitude between 1600 m and 2851 m. The rocks are predominantly granite and gneiss, but there are also carbonate rock. The reserve is rich in water resources and protects a number of glacial lakes, such as the Vasilashki Lakes, Tipitski Lakes, Gazeyski Lakes, Polezhanski Lakes and others which are the source of several rivers. The climate is alpine due to the high altitude. The soils are mainly brown forest and alpine meadow soils.

== Flora ==
The flora consists of over 700 species of vascular plants; of them 44 are included in the Red Book of Bulgaria. Some of the important species are globeflower (Trollius europaeus), narcissus anemone (Anemone narcissiflora), Aquilegia aurea, lake quillwort (Isoetes lacustris) – the only place where this plant is found in Bulgaria, Rhynchocorys elephas, curly sedge (Carex rupestris), etc. There are glacial relicts such as black crowberry (Empetrum nigrum) and creeping sibbaldia (Sibbaldia procumbens).

There are old growth forests of Macedonian pine (Pinus peuce), Scots pine (Pinus sylvestris), Norway spruce (Picea abies) and European silver fir (Abies alba), as well as isolated groups of Bosnian pine (Pinus heldreichii).

== Fauna ==
The most typical mammals in Yulen are brown bear, gray wolf and chamois. Birds are of species conservation importance and include spotted nutcracker, jack snipe, western capercaillie, rock partridge, horned lark, golden eagle, northern goshawk, etc. In sunnier areas there are common European vipers. The rivers and some of the glacial lakes have abundant brown trout populations.

== Landmarks ==
On the territory of the Yulen Reserve there is fortress from the Antiquity. The fortress is located at about 12 km from the town of Bansko. The excavations and the archaeological finds date its foundation from before the rule of the Roman Empire. The fortress is almost 100 m in length and between 25 and 40 m wide. The only visible remains of fortification is a small section of the northern walls.
