= Popinolashki waterfall =

Waterfall at Pirin, Bulgaria

Coordinates: 41°40′24″N 23°23′37″E

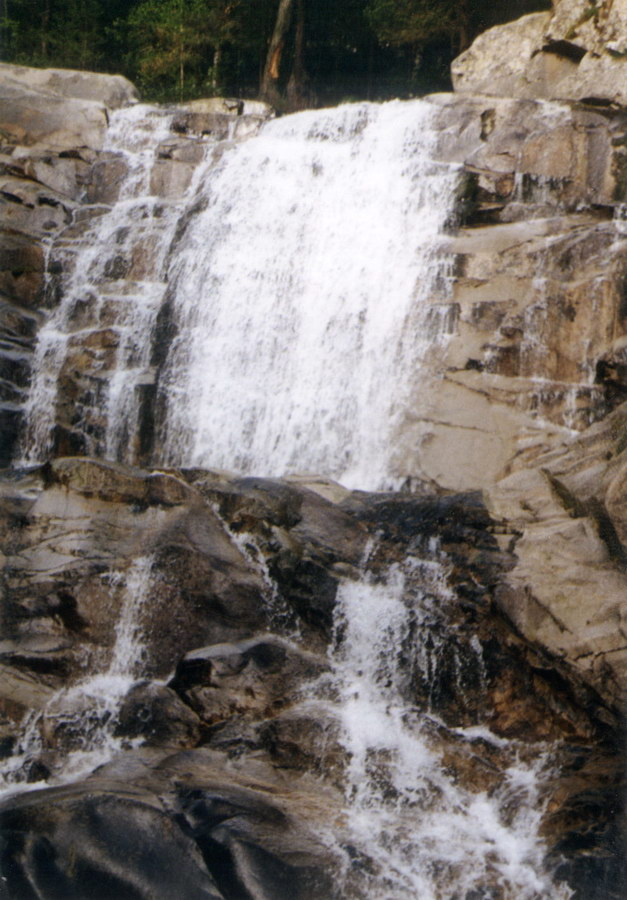
The Popinolashki waterfall

Popinolashki waterfall (Bulgarian: Попинолъшки водопад, Popinolashki vodopad) is a waterfall in the Bulgaria's Pirin mountain. It is situated at less than 20 km from the town of Sandanski, in a country-side known as Popina laka. It is located at an altitude of 1,230 m on the current of the Bashliitsa river. Its height is estimated at 12 m. There are woodlands in the vicinity. On 11 October 1965 the waterfall was designated a natural landmark.

== See also ==
- List of waterfalls
