= Prevalski Lakes =

Glacial lakes in Bulgaria

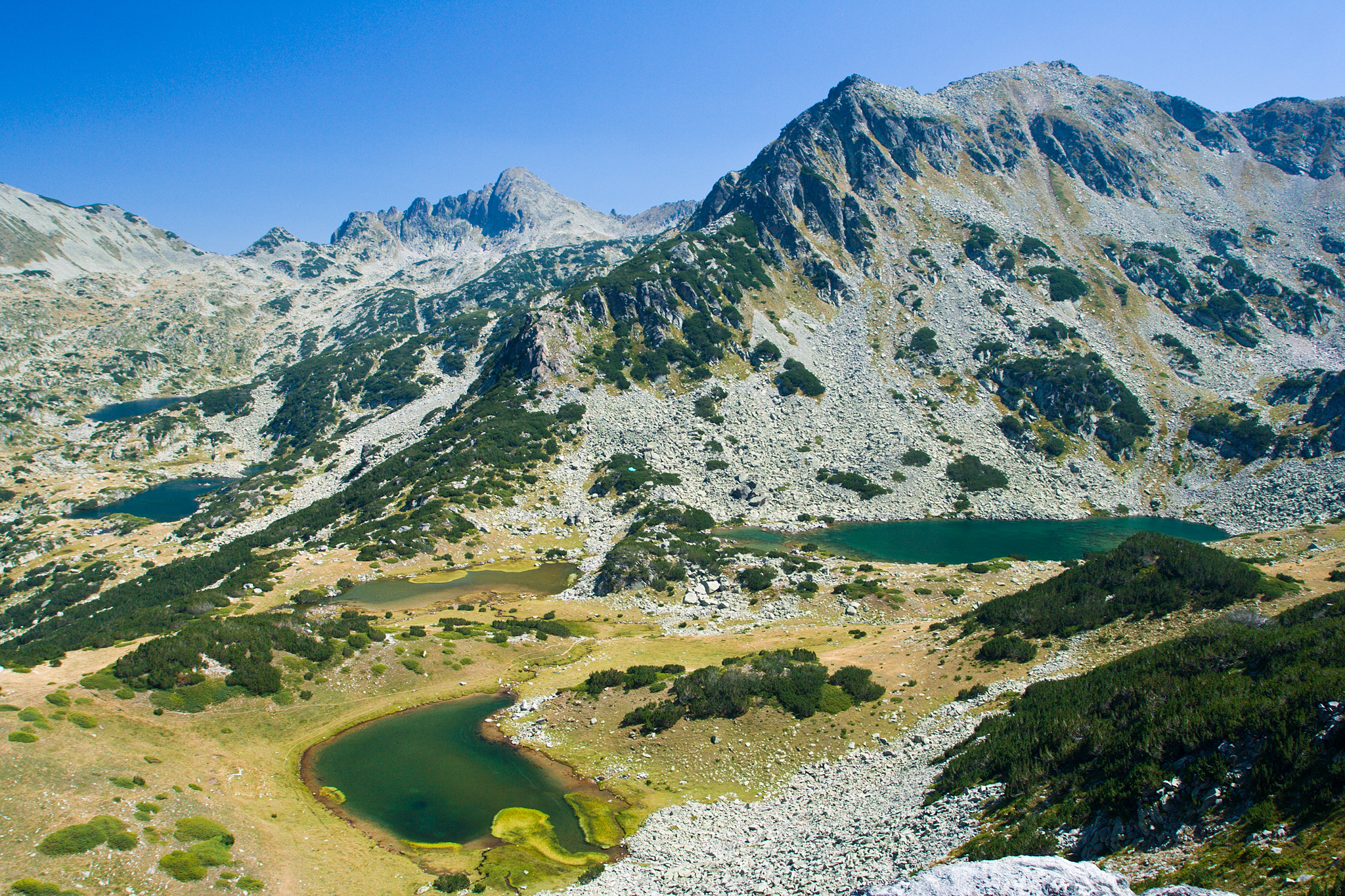

- Location within Bulgaria
- Coordinates: 41°42′21″N 23°28′15″E
- Basin countries: Bulgaria
- Max. depth: 5.2 m (17 ft)
- Surface elevation: 2,318 m (7,605 ft) to 2,394 m (7,854 ft)

Prevalski Lakes (Bulgarian: Превалски езера) are a group of four glacial lakes situated in the northern part of the Pirin mountain range, southwestern Bulgaria. They are located in the Prevalski cirque between the summits of Valyavishki Chukar (2,664 m) in the southeast and Prevalski Chukar (2,605 m) in the northwest, and the saddles of Mozgovishka Porta in the south and Prevala in the west. The lakes form the uppermost part of the Demyanitsa river valley. It is located in the Pirin National Park, a UNESCO World Heritage Site.

== Lakes ==
The first lake is the uppermost at an altitude of 2,394 m and the smallest in area, reaching 1,100 m^{2}. It drains underground to the second lake.

The second lake at an altitude of 2,312 m is located at 150 m to the north of the first one and at 700 m to the northwest of Valyavishki Chukar. It is the largest in the group, with surface area and volume larger than the other three combined. It has length of 265 m, width of 105 m, depth of 5.2 m and area of 62,490 m^{2}. The water volume is 54,000 m^{3}.

The third lake is located at an altitude of 2,330 m at about 200 m to the northwest of the second lake. It is smaller, with length of 150 m, width of 63 m and depth of 1.7 m. The water volume is 3,960 m^{3}.

Both the second and the third lake drain to the fourth lake at an altitude of 2,318 m through short torrential streams. That lake is very small and shallow and is the source of the river Valyavitsa, a left tributary of the Demyanitsa of the Mesta river basin.

There are several trails in the vicinity of the lake group, including the trail from the town of Bansko and Demyanitsa refuge to Begovitsa refuge, and the trail from Vihren refuge to Tevno Lake. The Prevala saddle is the starting point of a trail leading to the Chairski Lakes and the Bashliytsa locality.

== Gallery ==
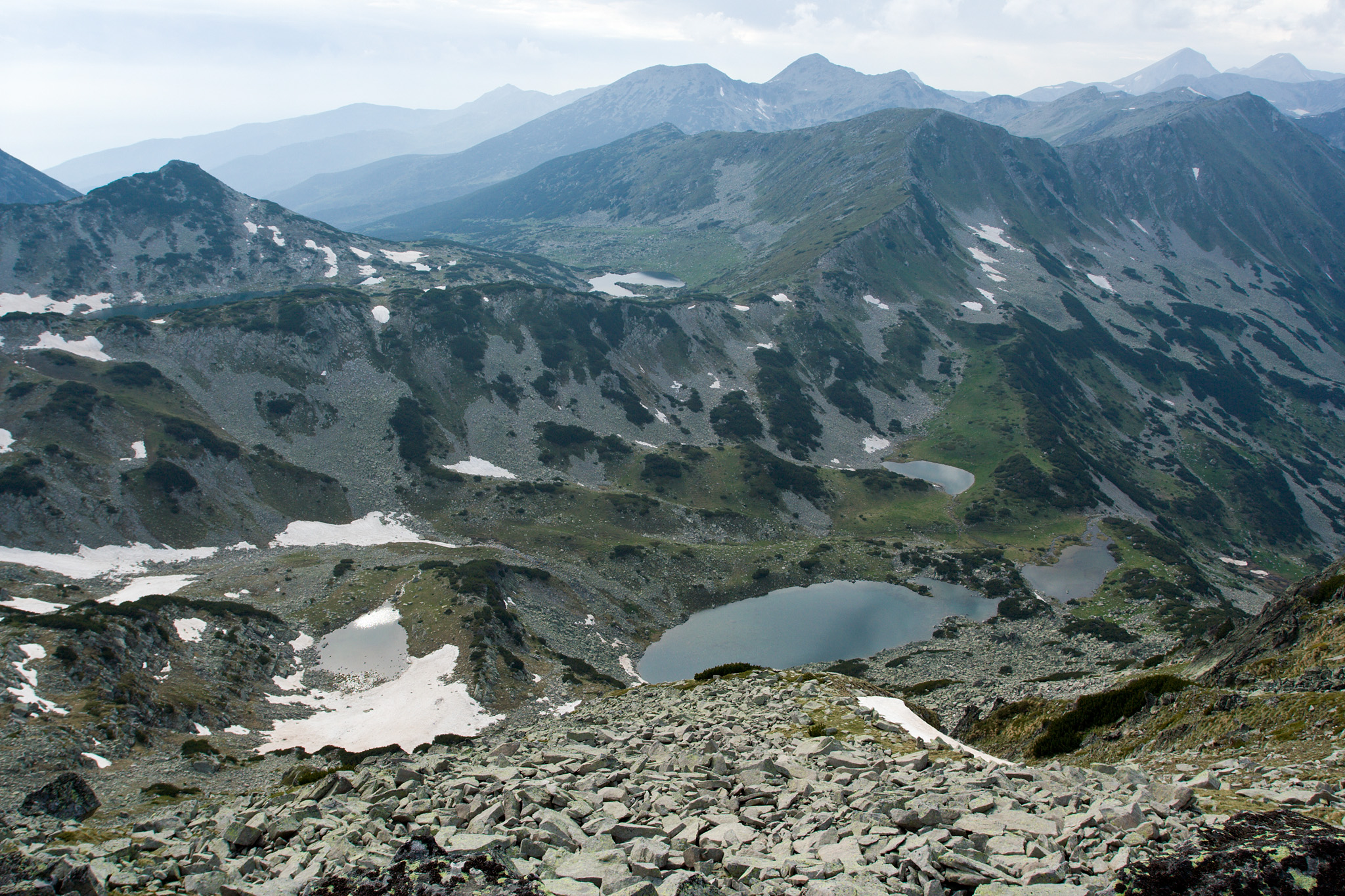

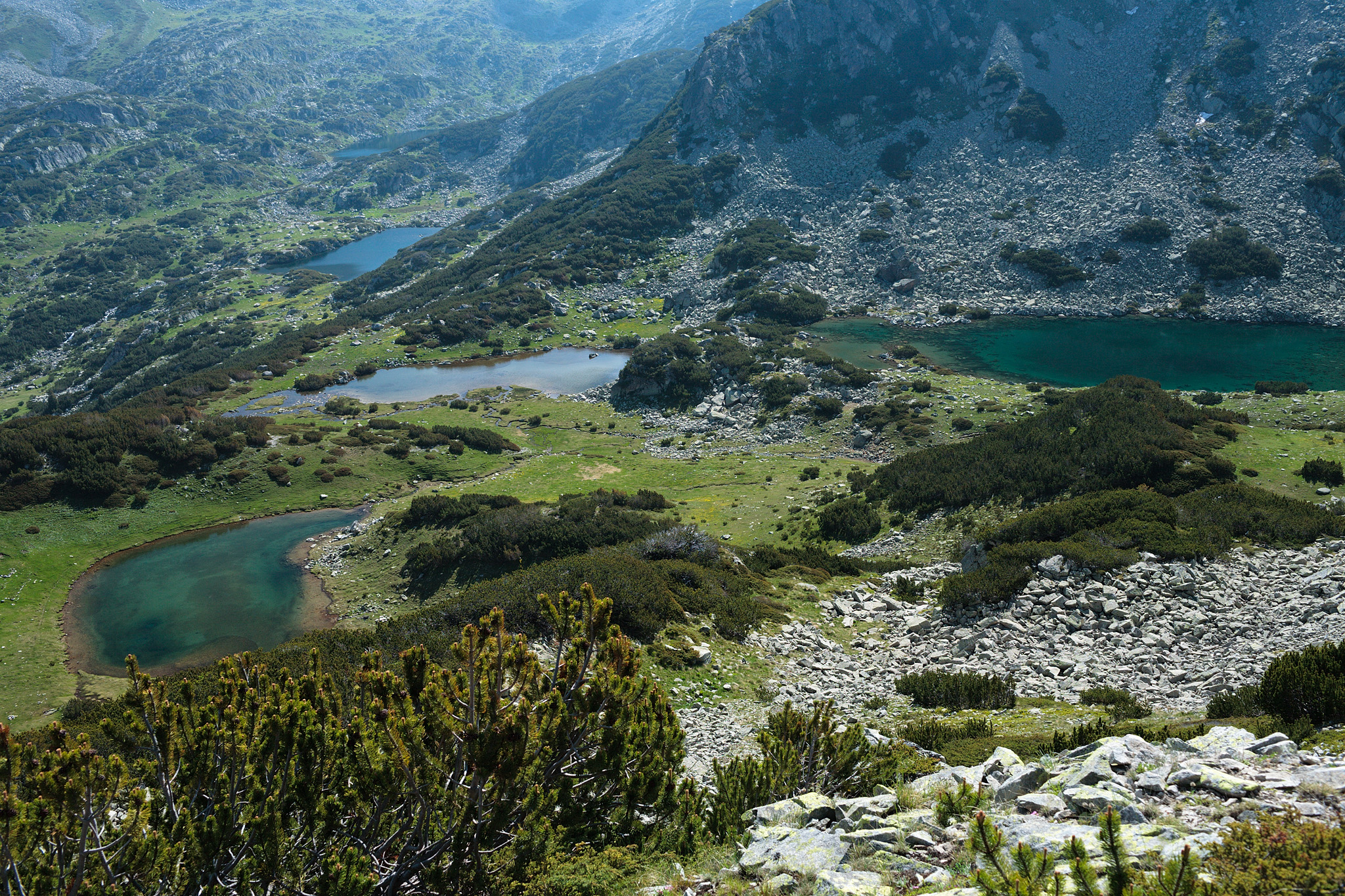

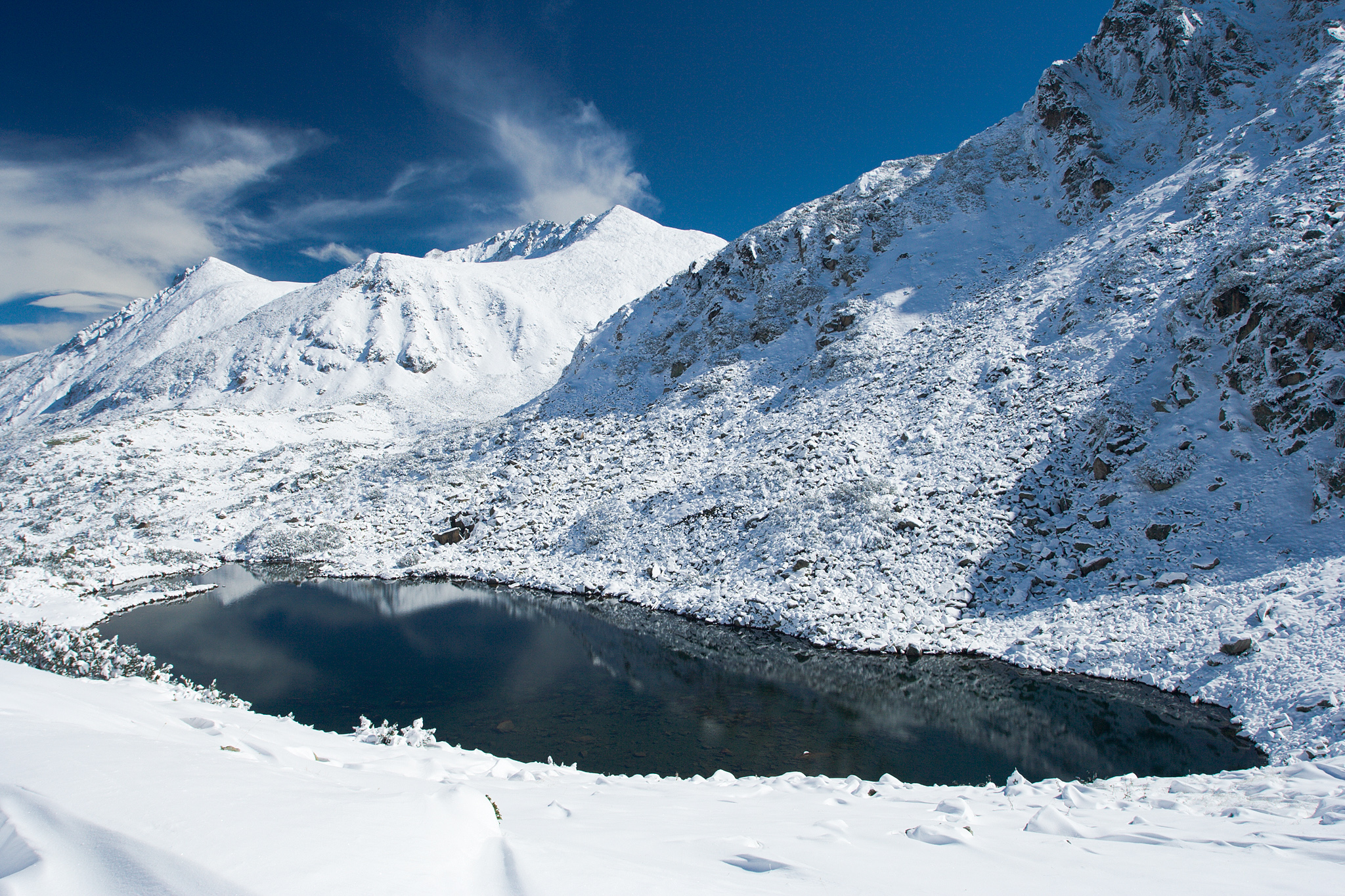
