= Salzitsa Lake =

Glacial lake in Bulgaria

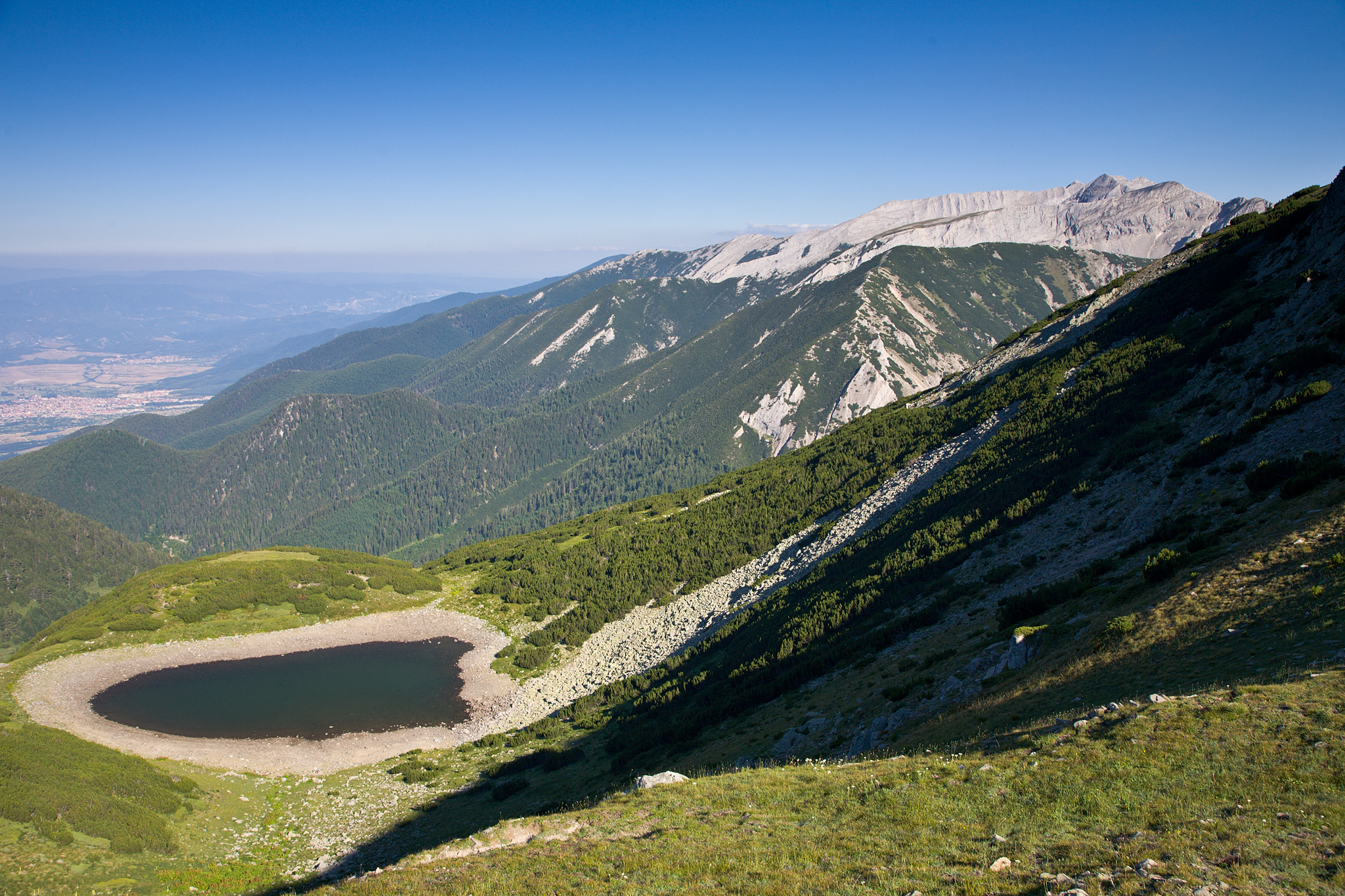

- Location within Bulgaria
- Location: Pirin
- Coordinates: 41°49′45″N 23°20′15″E
- Basin countries: Bulgaria
- Max. length: 100 m (330 ft)
- Max. width: 80 m (260 ft)
- Surface area: 6,200 m^{2} (67,000 sq ft)
- Max. depth: 2 m (6 ft 7 in)
- Surface elevation: 2,341 m (7,680 ft)

The Salzitsa Lake (Bulgarian: Сълзица), also known as Dautovo Lake (Даутово езеро) is a glacial lake in the Pirin mountain range, southwestern Bulgaria. It is situated at an altitude of 2,341 m in a small cirque at about 1 km to the northeast of the summit of Dautov Vrah (2,597 m). It is the northernmost lake in the mountain range.

The lake has an elliptical shape, reaching length of 100 m and width of 80 m. The surface area is 6,200 m^{2}; the depth is 2 m. Salzitsa Lake has predominantly snow-rain feed and may dry out in summer.

It is the source the small river Bela reka, a left tributary of the river Iztok of the Mesta river basin.

== Gallery ==
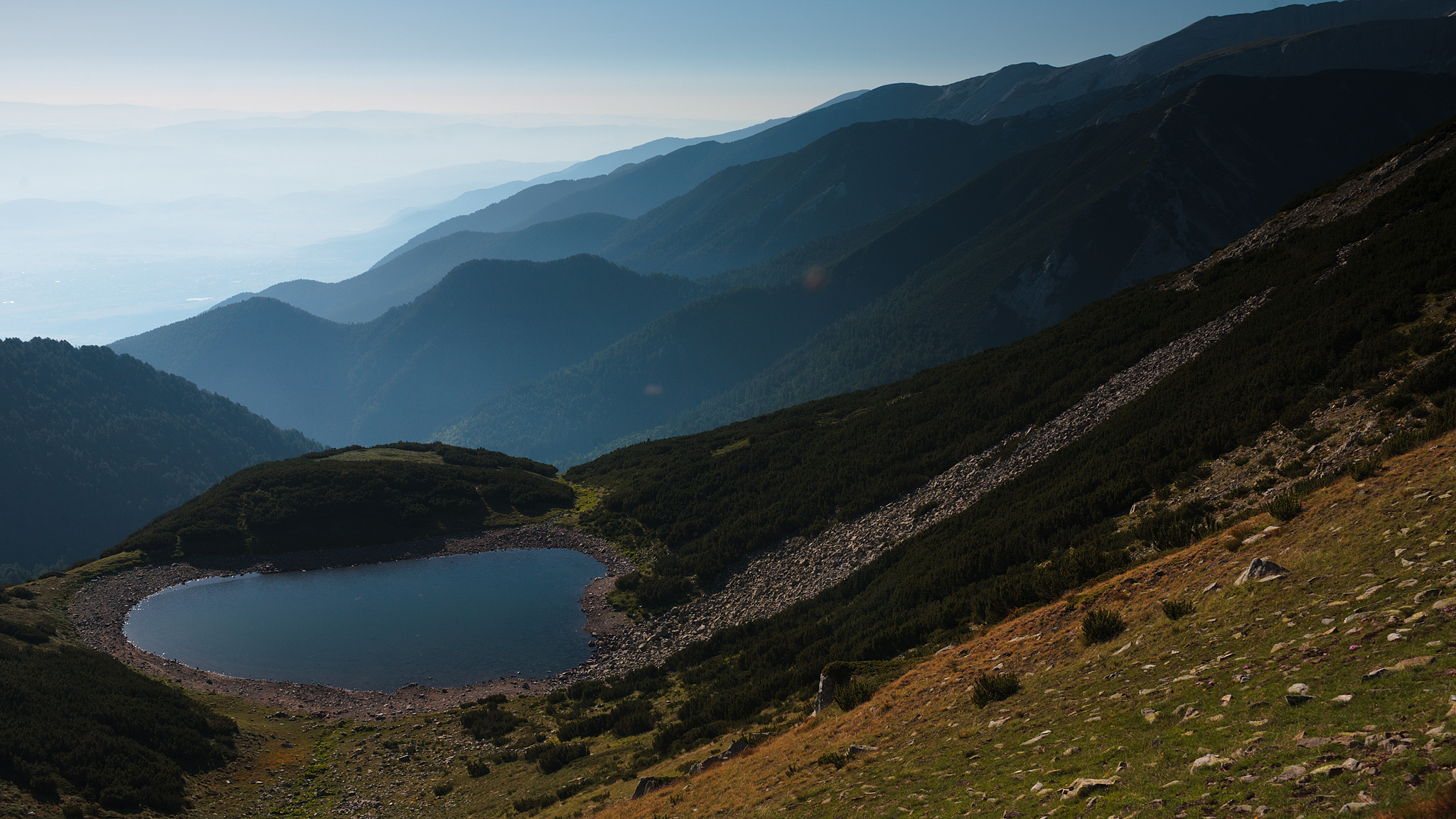

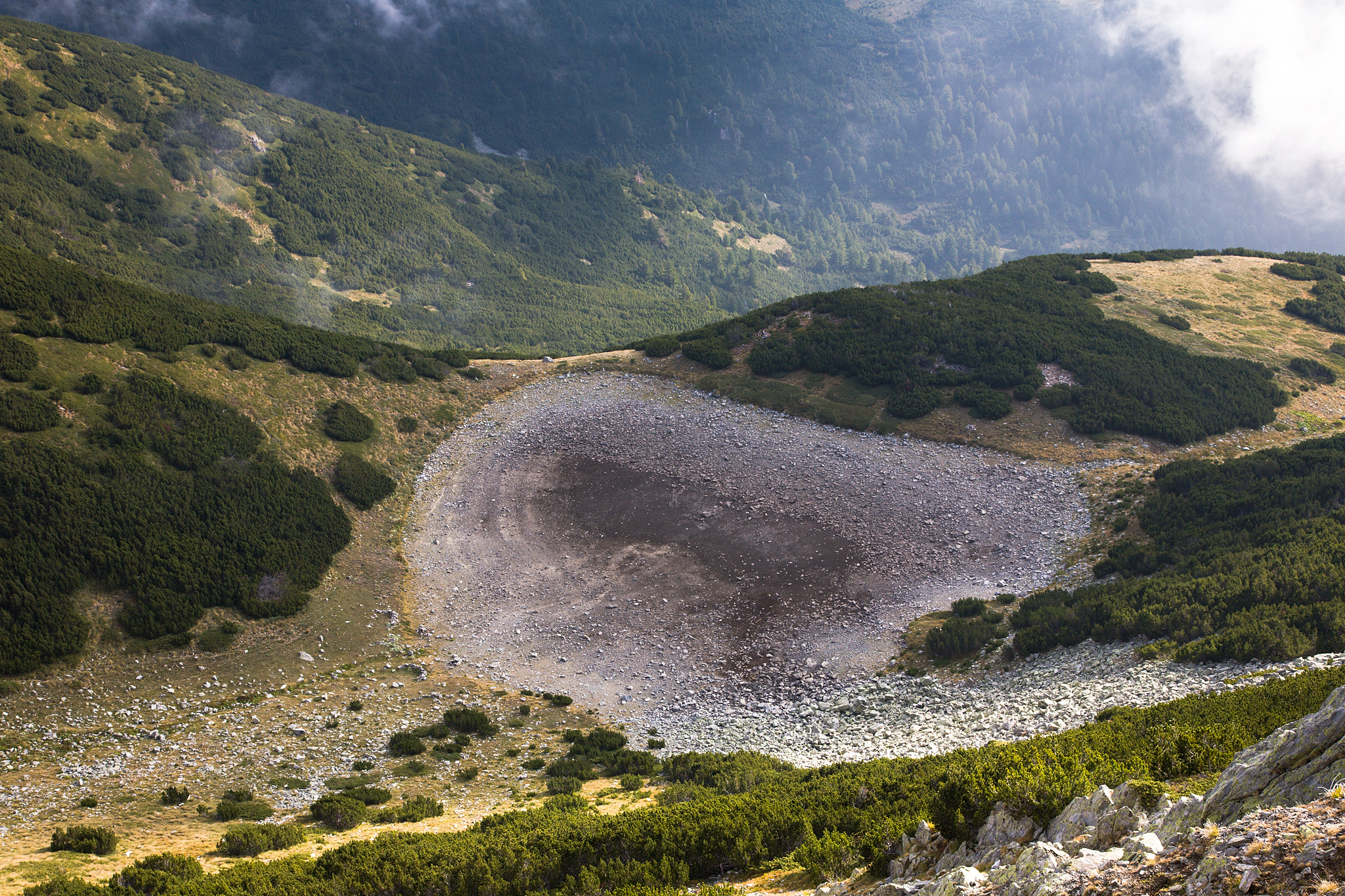
