= Pirinia =

Scientific classification
- Kingdom: Plantae
- Clade: Tracheophytes
- Clade: Angiosperms
- Clade: Eudicots
- Order: Caryophyllales
- Family: Caryophyllaceae
- Genus: Pirinia; M.Král (1984)
- Species: P. koenigii

Binomial name
- Pirinia koenigii M.Král (1984)

Genus of flowering plants

Pirinia is a monotypic genus of flowering plants belonging to the family Caryophyllaceae. The only species is Pirinia koenigii.

It is a perennial endemic to the Pirin mountain range of southwestern Bulgaria.
