= Disilitsa (river) =

Location
- Country: Bulgaria

Physical characteristics
- Source
  - location: Disilitsa Lake, Pirin
  - coordinates: 41°44′3.12″N 23°30′25.92″E
  - elevation: 2,367 m (7,766 ft)
- Mouth
  - location: Mesta
  - coordinates: 41°49′50.16″N 23°37′18.12″E
  - elevation: 705 m (2,313 ft)
- Length: 21 km (13 mi)
- Basin size: 57 km^{2} (22 sq mi)

Basin features
- Progression: Nestos→ Aegean Sea

The Disilitsa (Bulgarian: Дисилица), also known as Dobrinishtka reka, is a river in south-western Bulgaria, a right tributary of the Mesta. The river is 21 km long and drains parts of the northeastern slopes of the Pirin mountain range.

The Disilitsa takes its source from the Disilitsa glacial lake, at an altitude of 2,367 m in the Polezhan cirque. In 10 km, at an altitude of 1,148 m it takes its main tributary, the Pleshka reka. Both rivers flow in north–northeastern direction in deep forested valleys, which merge after their confluence. The river flows though the eastern part of the town of Dobrinishte in the Razlog Valley, and continues to flow eastwards in a deep valley for another 5 km. It flows into the Mesta at an altitude of 705 m.

Its drainage basin covers a territory of 57 km^{2} or 1.65% of Mesta's total.

The only settlement along the river is Dobrinishte in Bansko Municipality, Blagoevgrad Province. A 4.4 km stretch of the second class II-19 road Simitli–Gotse Delchev–Ilinden at the border with Greece follows the Disilitsa's lower course. A small part of the river's water resources are utilised for irrigation.
