= Pirin Mountains =

Mountain range in southwestern Bulgaria

- Bulgarian: Пирин
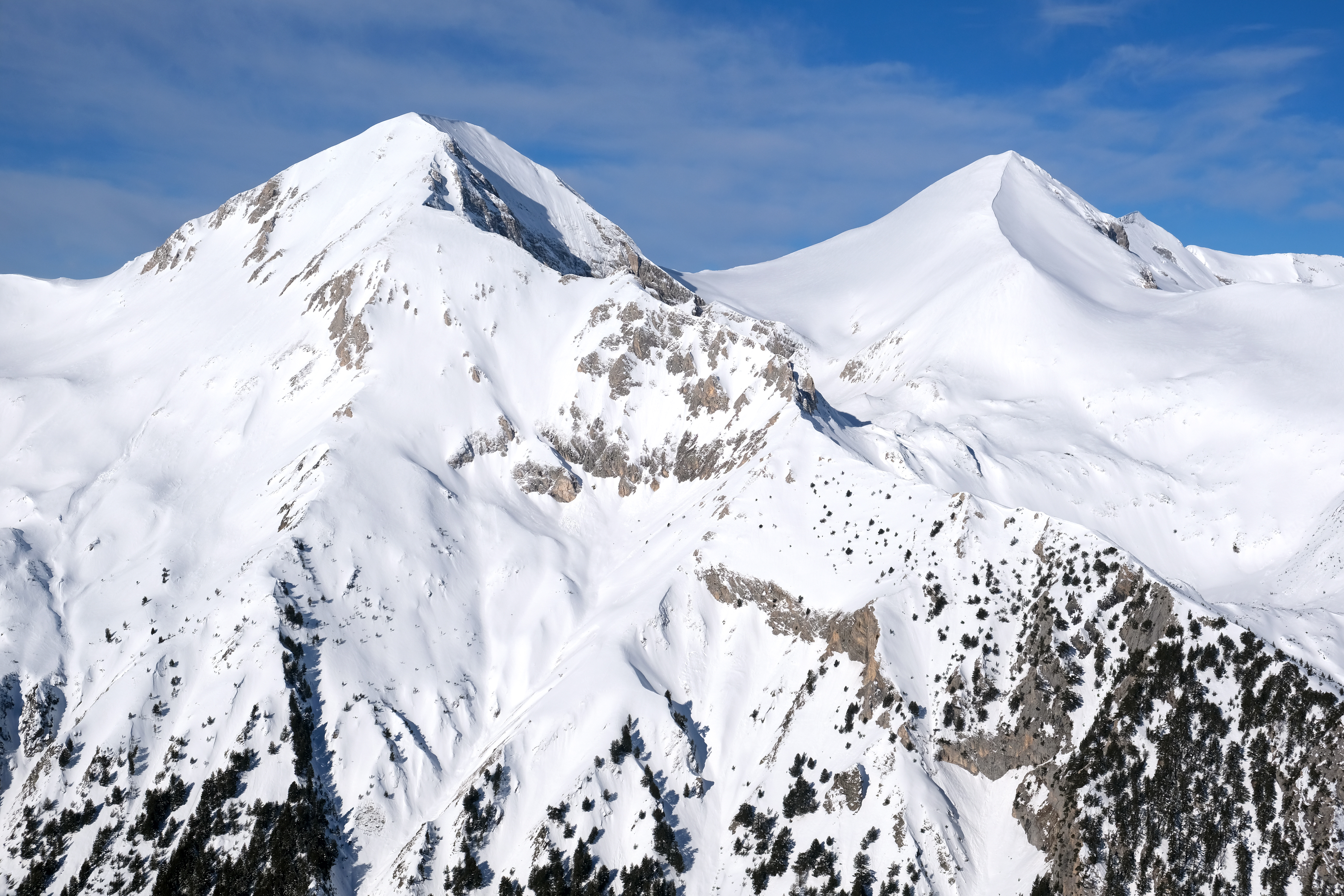
- Pirin scenery in winter: Vihren, the highest peak of Pirin Mountains, from Bansko ski center. Kutelo peak on the background.

Highest point
- Peak: Vihren
- Elevation: 2,914 m (9,560 ft)
- Coordinates: 41°45′49″N 23°23′58″E

Dimensions
- Length: 80 km (50 mi) north-south
- Width: 40 km (25 mi) north-south
- Area: 2,585 km^{2} (998 mi^{2})

Geography
- Country: Bulgaria

Geology
- Rock type(s): granite, gneiss, marble, limestone

The Pirin Mountains (Bulgarian: Пирин [ˈpirin]) are a mountain range in southwestern Bulgaria, with the highest peak, Vihren, at an altitude of 2,914 m (9,560 ft).

The range extends about 80 km (50 mi) from the north-west to the south-east and is about 40 km (25 mi) wide, spanning a territory of 2,585 km^{2} (998 sq mi). To the north, Pirin is separated from Bulgaria's highest mountain range, the Rila Mountain, by the Predel saddle, while to the south it reaches the Slavyanka Mountain. To the west is located the valley of the river Struma and to the east the valley of the river Mesta separates it from the Rhodope Mountains. Pirin is dotted with more than a hundred glacial lakes and is also the home of Europe's southernmost glaciers, Snezhnika and Banski Suhodol.

The northern part of the range, which is also the highest one, is protected by the Pirin National Park, declared a UNESCO World Heritage Site in 1983. Pirin is noted for its rich flora and fauna, as well as for the presence of a number of relict species. Much of the area is forested, with some of the best preserved conifer woods in Bulgaria, holding important populations of the Balkan endemic species Macedonian pine, Bosnian pine and Bulgarian fir. Animals include many species of high conservation value, such as brown bear, gray wolf, wildcat, European pine marten, wild boar, red deer, roe deer, chamois, etc.

The combination of favourable natural conditions and varied historical heritage makes Pirin an important tourist destination. The town of Bansko, situated on the north-eastern slopes of the mountain, has grown to be the primary ski and winter sports centre in the Balkans. A number of settlements at the foothills of Pirin have mineral spring and are spa resorts — Banya, Dobrinishte, Gotse Delchev, Sandanski, etc. Melnik at the south-western foothills of the mountain is Bulgaria's smallest town and is an architectural reserve. Within a few kilometres from the town are the Melnik Earth Pyramids and the Rozhen Monastery.

The name of the mountain may, according to one hypothesis, derive from Perun, the highest god of the Slavic pantheon and the god of thunder and lightning. Another version is that the etymology of the range can be traced to the Thracian word Perinthos, meaning "Rocky Mountain".

== Geography ==
=== Overview ===
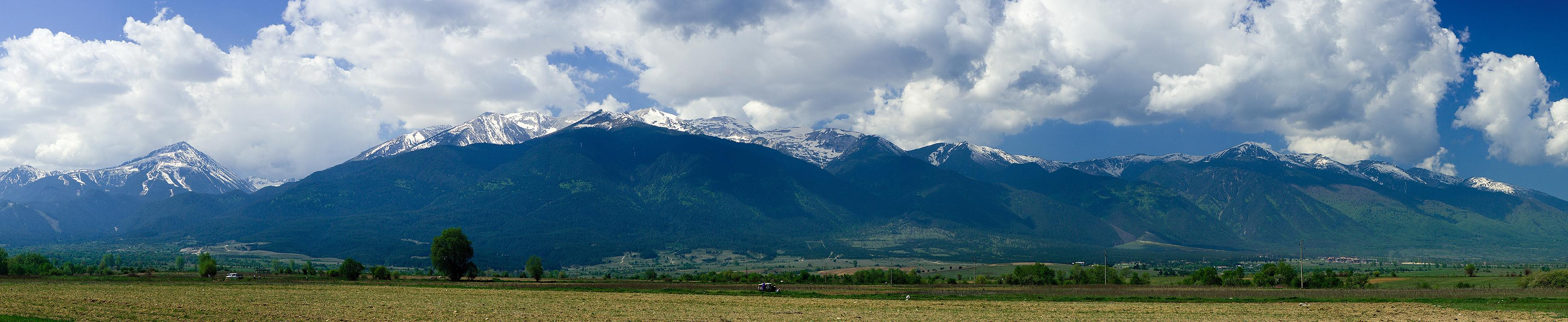
Panorama of Pirin from the Razlog Valley

Pirin is situated in south-western Bulgaria and is part of the Rila–Rhodope Massif. To the north, the Predel Saddle and mountain pass at 1,140 m (3,740 ft) altitude separates it from the Rila mountain range. To the east, Pirin borders the Razlog Valley, the valley of the river Mesta and the Momina Klisura Gorge that separate it from the Rhodope Mountains. To the south, the Paril Saddle (1,170 m (3,840 ft)) divides it from the Slavyanka mountain range. To the west, Pirin reaches the valley of the river Struma, including the Kresna Gorge and the Sandanski–Petrich Valley, that serve as a divide from the Vlahina, Maleshevo and Ograzhden mountains further to the west.

The main orographic ridge extends from the north-west to the south-east. Pirin spans an area of 2,585 km^{2} (998 mi^{2}) with an average height of 1,033 m (3,389 ft). The maximum length between the Paril and Predel saddles is 80 km (50 mi); the maximum width is 40 km (25 mi). Reaching an altitude of 2,914 m (9,560 ft), Pirin is the second highest mountain range in Bulgaria after Rila (2,925 m (9,596 ft)) and the eighth highest in Europe after the Caucasus, the Alps, Sierra Nevada, the Pyrenees, Mount Etna, the aforementioned Rila, and Mount Olympus.

=== Division ===
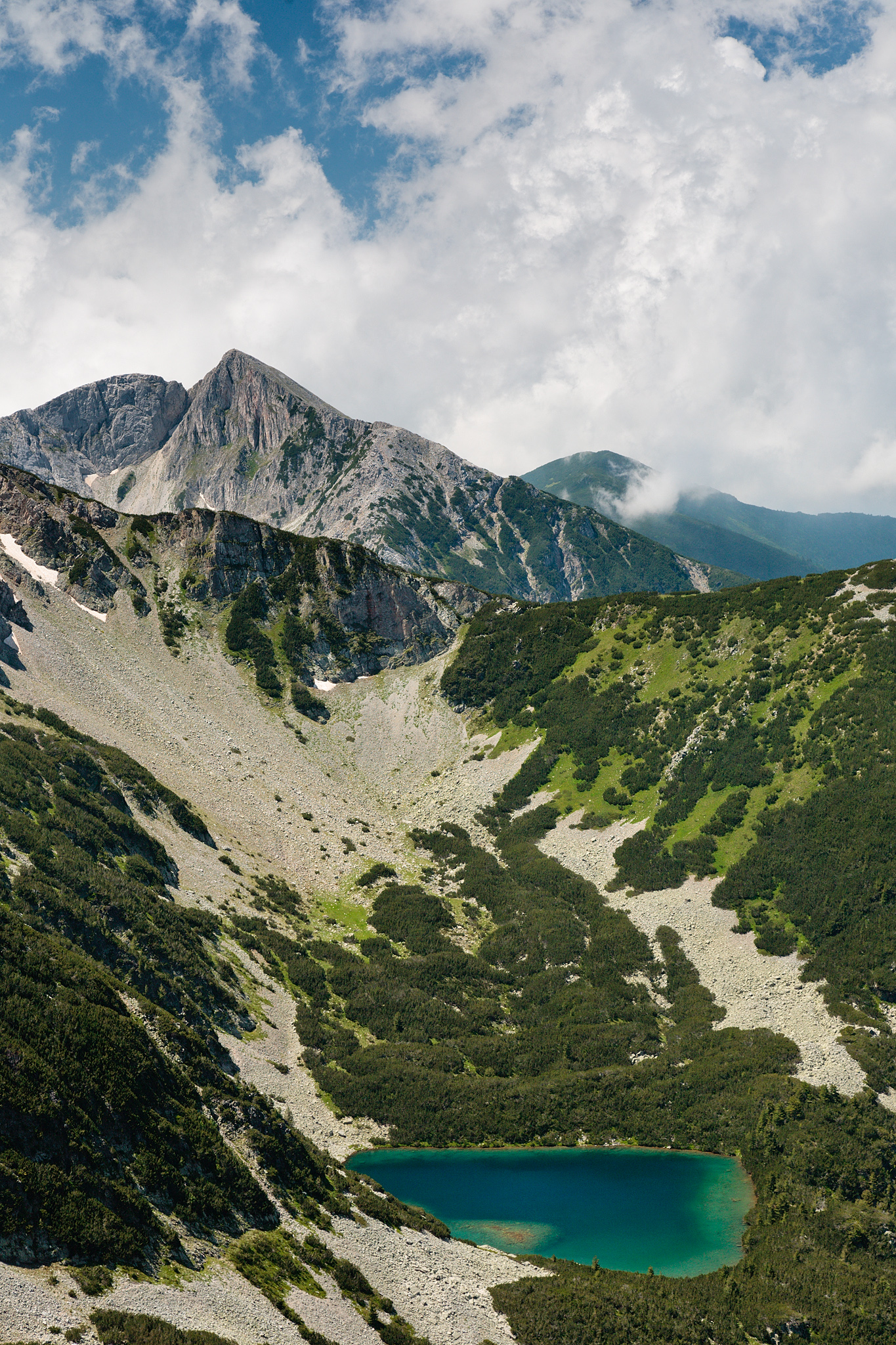
A view to Sinanitsa

Geologically and morphologically Pirin is divided into three parts: north, central and south, which differ sharply in size and altitude. North Pirin is the largest of the subdivisions and the mountain's downright part. It takes up 74% of the whole range's territory, being about 42 km (26 mi) long and ranging from Predel to the north to the Todorova Polyana Saddle (1,883 m (6,178 ft)) to the south. It is the most often visited part of the mountain, the only one to have an Alpine appearance, featuring many glacial lakes, resthouses and shelters. North Pirin is itself divided into two zones by the Kabata Saddle and the valleys of the Banderitsa and Vlahinska rivers. The northern zone consists of the steep marble Vihren ridge with the three highest summits in the range: Vihren (2,914 m (9,560 ft)), Kutelo (2,908 m (9,541 ft)) and Banski Suhodol (2,884 m (9,462 ft)). The marble ridge is narrow and very steep, reaching a width of only 0.5 m (1.6 ft) at the ridge Koncheto (2,810 m (9,220 ft)). The southern zone is more massive and consists primarily of granite ridges, including Pirin's fourth highest summit Polezhan, at 2,851 m (9,354 ft). The southern zone also has marble ridges, such as the Sinanitsa ridge with its homonymous summit (2,516 m (8,255 ft)). In total, the northern section of Pirin includes two summits with an altitude over 2,900 m (9,500 ft), seven over 2,800 m (9,200 ft), 13 over 2,700 m (8,900 ft), and 60 over 2,500 m (8,200 ft).

Central Pirin extends between the Todorova Polyana Saddle and the Popovi Livadi Saddle. It constitutes the smallest and the shortest of the three subdivisions, covering only 7% of Pirin's total area. It is composed of crystalline schists and granite, as well as of marbled limestone in the south. Because of the karstic relief there are no lakes; the rivers springing up from Central Pirin are short and with low water volume. It is largely covered by deciduous forests. The highest peak is Orelyak (2,099 m (6,886 ft)), while the other summits are under 2,000 m (6,600 ft).

South Pirin stretches from the Popovi Livadi Saddle to the Paril Saddle and is the lowest and least rugged part. The highest peak is Ushite at 1,978 m (6,490 ft), although Sveshtnik (1,975 m (6,480 ft)) had long been considered the highest summit. It constitutes 19% of the mountain's territory. Despite being characterised with relatively flat ridges, its lateral slopes are steep. South Pirin is composed of granite with marbled limestone in the periphery. It lacks glacial forms and is covered with forests. Like Central Pirin, the springs are short and with low water discharge.

== Geology, relief and peaks in Pirin ==
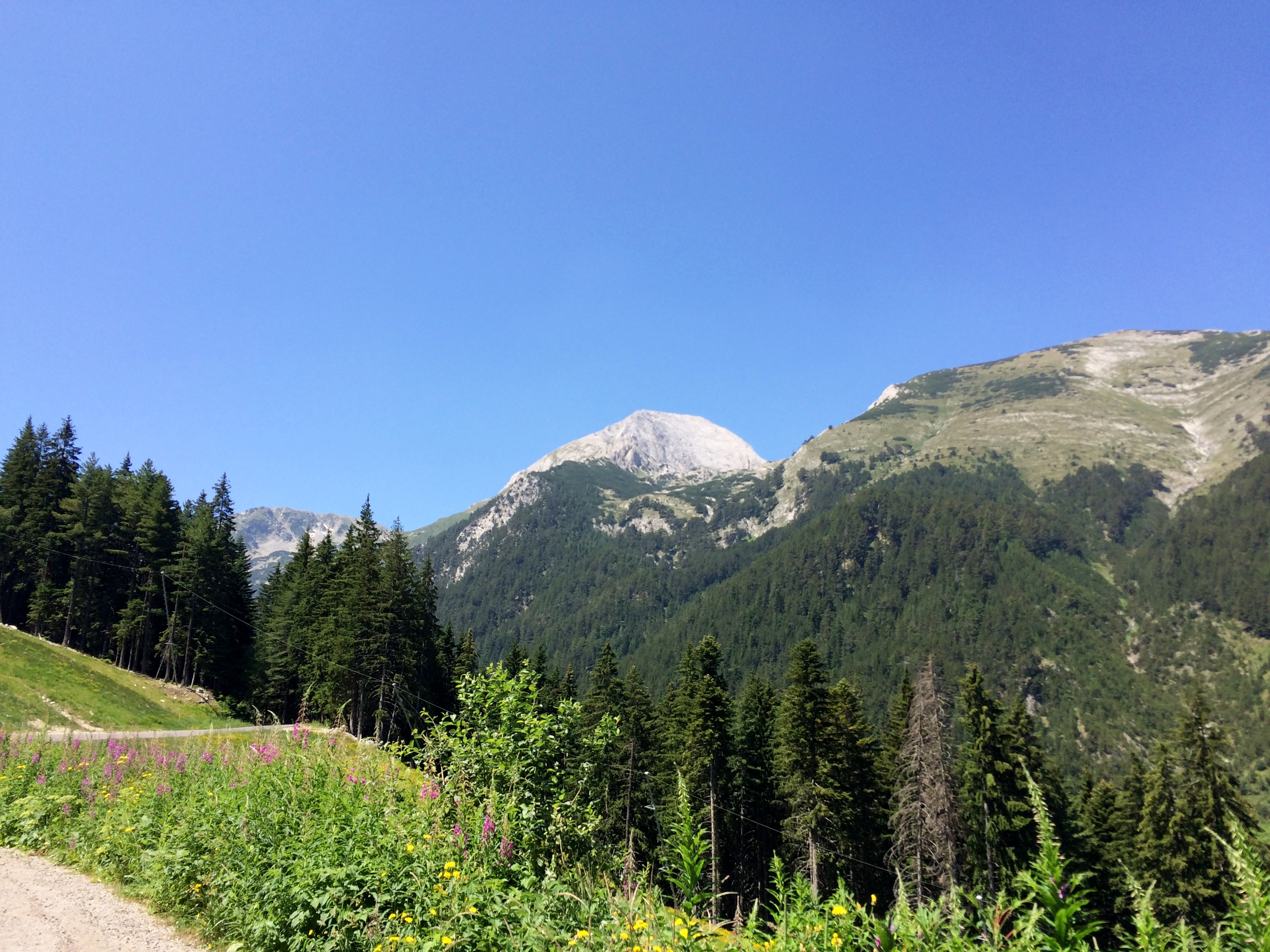
A view to Vihren, Pirin's highest summit

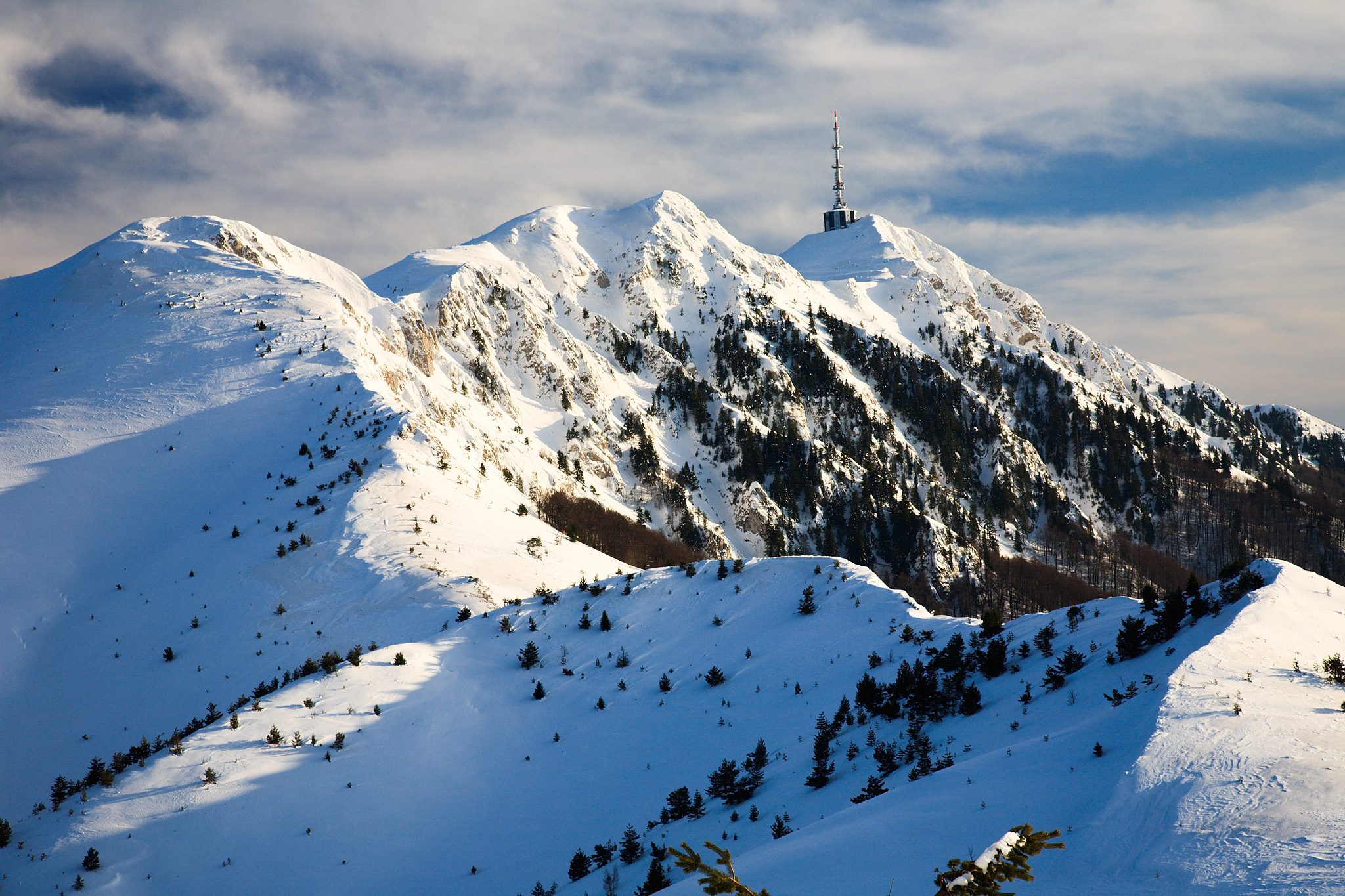
Orelyak, the highest peak of Central Pirin

Geologically Pirin is a horst forming a massive anticline situated between the complex graben valleys of the Struma and the Mesta, formed by metamorphic rocks — gneiss, biotite and crystalline schists, amphibolite, quartzite and marble. Granite rocks cover 62% of the mountain's area. The tectonics of the Pirin is primarily the result of Precambrian, Hercynian, alpine and tectonic movements and events. Its hoisting alternated with long dormant periods. As a result of the activisation of the ancient Struma and Mesta faults during the Neogene and the Quaternary Pirin rose as a massive horst.

The modern relief of Pirin was shaped in the Pleistocene when the mountain was subjected to alpine glaciation related to the global cooling. This glaciation occurred in parallel with that of the Alps. The process formed pointed pyramidal peaks, long U-shaped valley, cirques, moraine fields and vertical cliffs that characterise Pirin's contemporary appearance. These forms are most prominent at the north-eastern ridges of the mountain. Some lateral moraines may reach heights of more than 1,100 m (3,600 ft). The lower line of the glaciers was at 2,200–2,300 m (7,200–7,500 ft). Karst landforms also shape Pirin's relief with ponors, swallow holes, caves, etc.

The main Pirin ridge is clearly distinguished; it begins in Rila and passes through the Predel saddle as far as the Paril saddle. It links the separate smaller ridges of the mountain into one system with the highest peaks situated on it. Although it curves a lot, its main direction is from the northwest to southeast and it is also a watershed between the Struma and the Mesta rivers. There are many spurs but four of them are so large that they create the appearance of the mountain: Sinanishko, Todorino, Polezhansko and Kamenishko.

There are two peaks above 2,900 m (9,500 ft), Vihren and Kutelo; seven above 2,800 m (9,200 ft); 13 above 2,700 m (8,900 ft); 32 above 2,600 m (8,500 ft) and 60 above 2,500 m (8,200 ft). The highest granite peak is the Banderishki Chukar (2,732 m (8,963 ft)). Some of the highest peaks are:

- Vihren, 2,914 metres (9,560 ft)
- Kutelo, 2,908 metres (9,541 ft)
- Banski Suhodol, 2,884 metres (9,462 ft)
- Polezhan, 2,851 metres (9,354 ft)
- Kamenitsa, 2,822 metres (9,259 ft)
- Malak Polezhan, 2,822 metres (9,259 ft)
- Bayuvi Dupki, 2,820 metres (9,252 ft)
- Yalovarnika, 2,763 metres (9,065 ft)
- Kaymakchal, 2,763 metres (9,065 ft)
- Gazey, 2,761 metres (9,058 ft)
- Todorka, 2,746 metres (9,009 ft)
- Banderishki Chukar, 2,732 metres (8,963 ft)
- Dzhengal, 2,730 metres (8,957 ft)
- Momin Dvor, 2,723 metres (8,934 ft)
- Malka Todorka, 2,712 metres (8,898 ft)
- Chengelchal, 2,709 metres (8,888 ft)
- Disilitsa, 2,700 metres (8,858 ft)
- Kamenishka Kukla, 2,690 metres (8,825 ft)
- Zabat, 2,688 metres (8,819 ft)
- Kuklite, 2,686 metres (8,812 ft)
- Bashliyski Chukar, 2,683 metres (8,802 ft)
- Kralev Dvor, 2,680 metres (8,793 ft)
- Muratov Vrah, 2,669 metres (8,757 ft)
- Dzhano, 2,668 metres (8,753 ft)
- Bezbog, 2,645 metres (8,678 ft)
- Hvoynati Vrah, 2,635 metres (8,645 ft)
- Sivria, 2,591 metres (8,501 ft)
- Sinanitsa, 2,516 metres (8,255 ft)

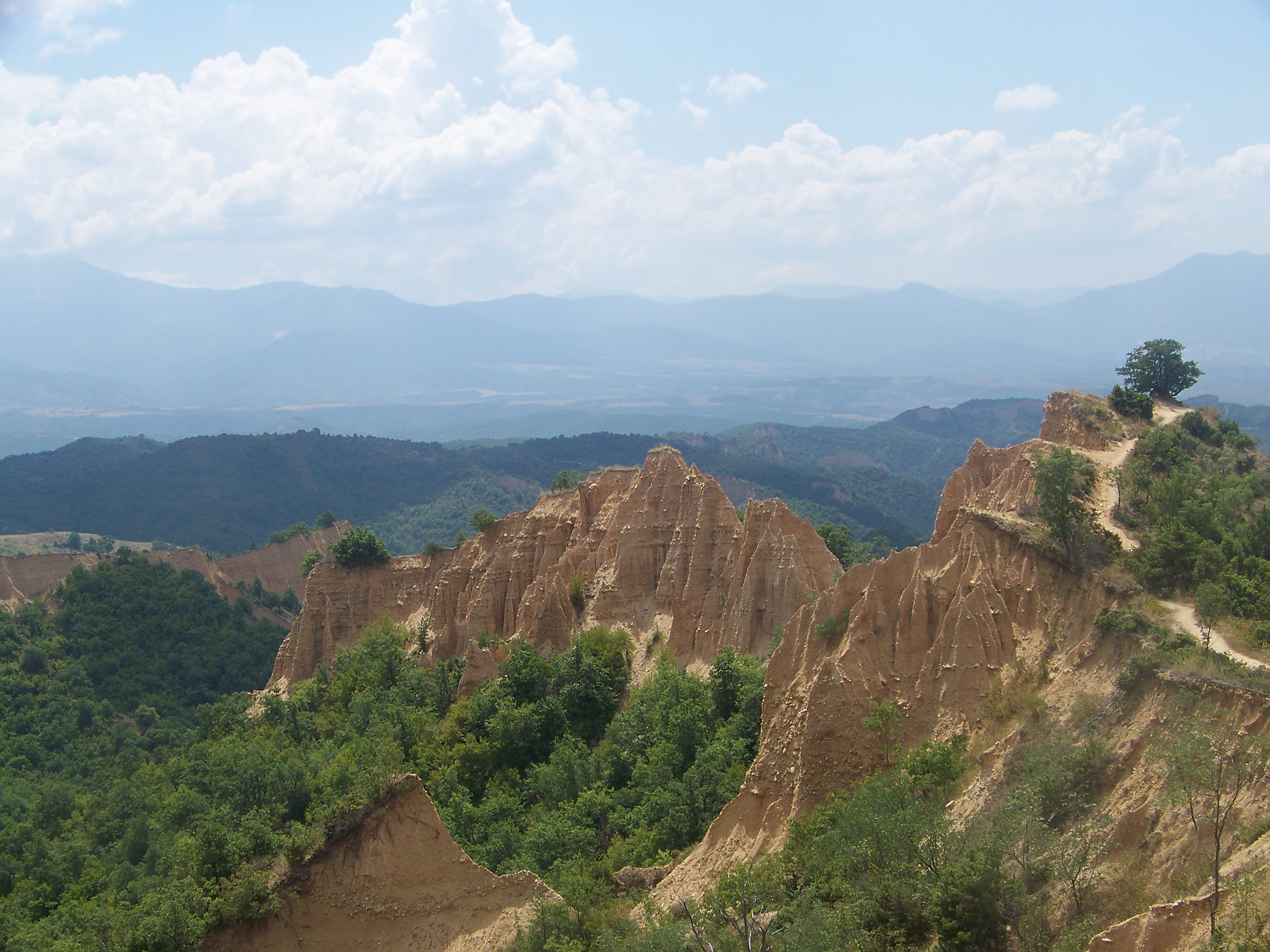
A view of the Melnik Earth Pyramids

The most recognisable rock formation in the mountain range are the Melnik Earth Pyramids situated in the southwestern reaches of Pirin in the vicinity of the homonymous town. They are located at an altitude between 350 and 850 m (1,150 and 2,790 ft) and are composed of sandstone and conglomerates dated from the Neogene and the Quaternary Periods. The Pyramids were formed as a result of erosion as the Melnishka River and its tributaries had carved their way into the hills forging pyramid-like forms of significant aesthetic value that reach a height of 100 m (330 ft). This process began 4–5 million years ago and is still ongoing. The combination of pale Pliocene sandstones and red Quaternary conglomerates determines the yellowish and reddish colour gamut and the diverse shapes. The Melnik Earth Pyramids constitute a specific and unique micro habitat of high conservation value and were designated a natural landmark in 1960.

Similar rock formations are found further north along the slopes of Pirin facing the Struma Valley near the town of Kresna.

== Climate ==
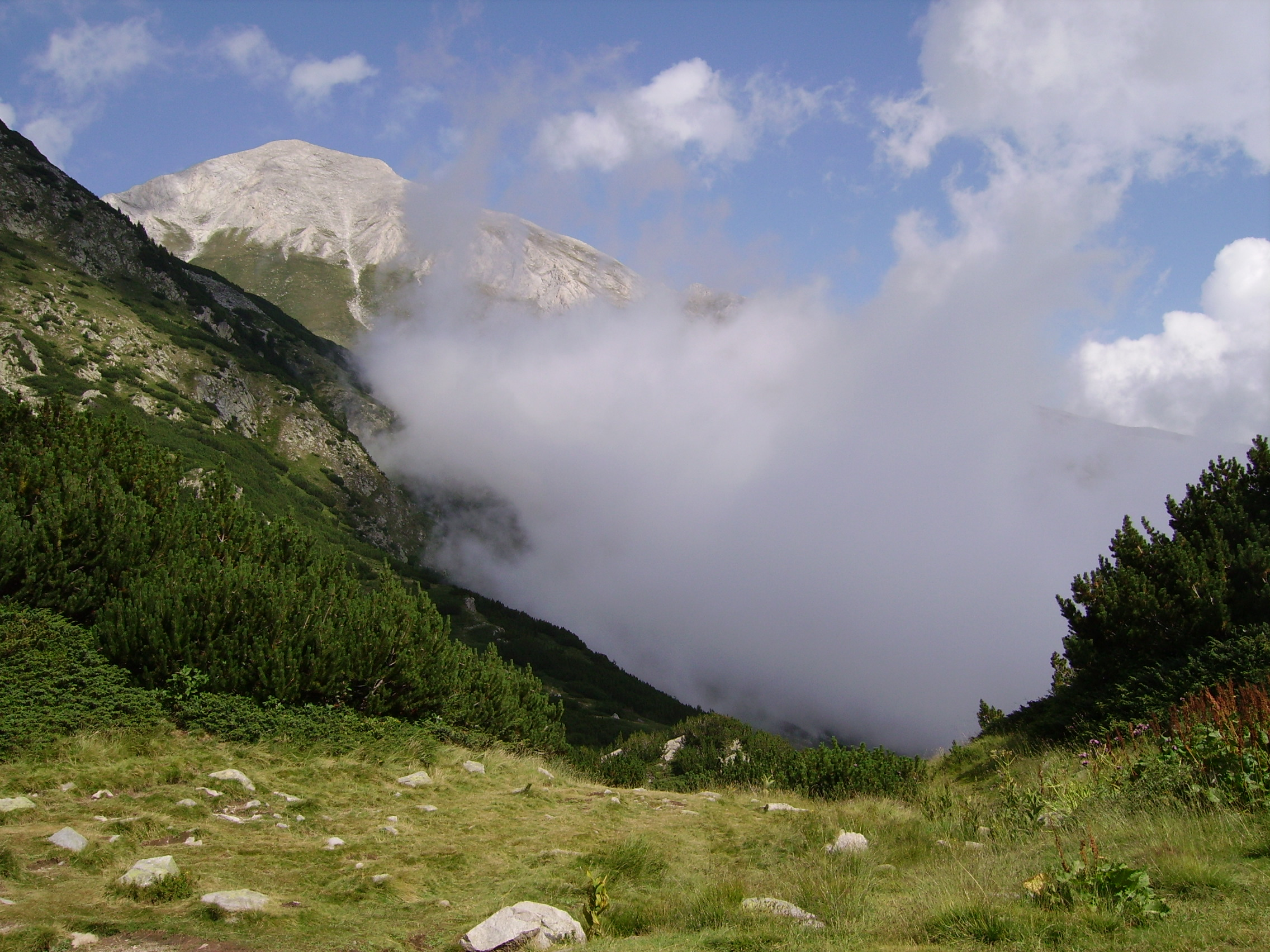
Low clouds in Pirin

Pirin is situated within the continental Mediterranean climate zone and due to its altitude the higher sectors have Alpine climate. The climate is influenced by Mediterranean cyclones mainly in late autumn and in winter, bringing frequent and high rainfall, and by the Azores anticyclone in summer, making the summer months hot and dry. The relief has a crucial influence on the climate. Pirin has three altitude climate zones — low between 600 and 1,000 m, middle between 1,000 and 1,800 m and high above 1,800 m. The low altitude zone is heavily influenced by the Mediterranean climate, the influence being more pronounced on the western slopes facing the Struma valley than on the eastern slopes along the Mesta valley. The high altitude zone is characterised by low temperature, low temperature amplitude, many cloudy days, lasting and thick snow cover, strong winds and intensive sun radiation.

Winters are cold and prolonged while summers are cool and short. The temperature decreases with the altitude, which is more visible in summer. The mean annual temperature is around 9–10 °C in the low, 5–7 °C in the middle and 2–3 °C in the high altitude zone. The coldest month is January with average temperature varying between −5 and −2 °C. The hottest month is July with temperature averaging 20 °C at 1,600 m and 15 °C at 2,000 m. Temperature inversions, i.e. increase in temperature with height, are observed in 75% of the winter days.

The annual precipitation in Pirin is 600–700 mm in the lower zones and 1000–1200 mm in the higher. The rainfall occurs mostly in winter and spring, while summer is driest season. The air humidity is 60–75% in August and 80–85 % in December. In winter the precipitation is mainly snow, varying from 70–90% at the lower altitudes to 100% at higher. The average number of days with snow cover varies from 20–30 to 120–160. The highest thickness of the snow cover reaches 40–60 cm at 1,000–1,800 m in February and 160–180 cm above 1,800 m in March (190 cm on Vihren). In some winters the snow thickness can reach 250–350 cm. Avalanches are frequent.

The prevailing wind direction is from the west and the north-west but southern and south-western winds are also frequent. The wind speed can reach 34–40 m/s at the high ridges, being highest in February and March and lowest in August and September. The percentage of windless days increases in summer and autumn to 30–40% at lower altitude and 10–15% at higher. In the highest zone the percentage does not exceed 5–7% annually.

== Hydrology ==
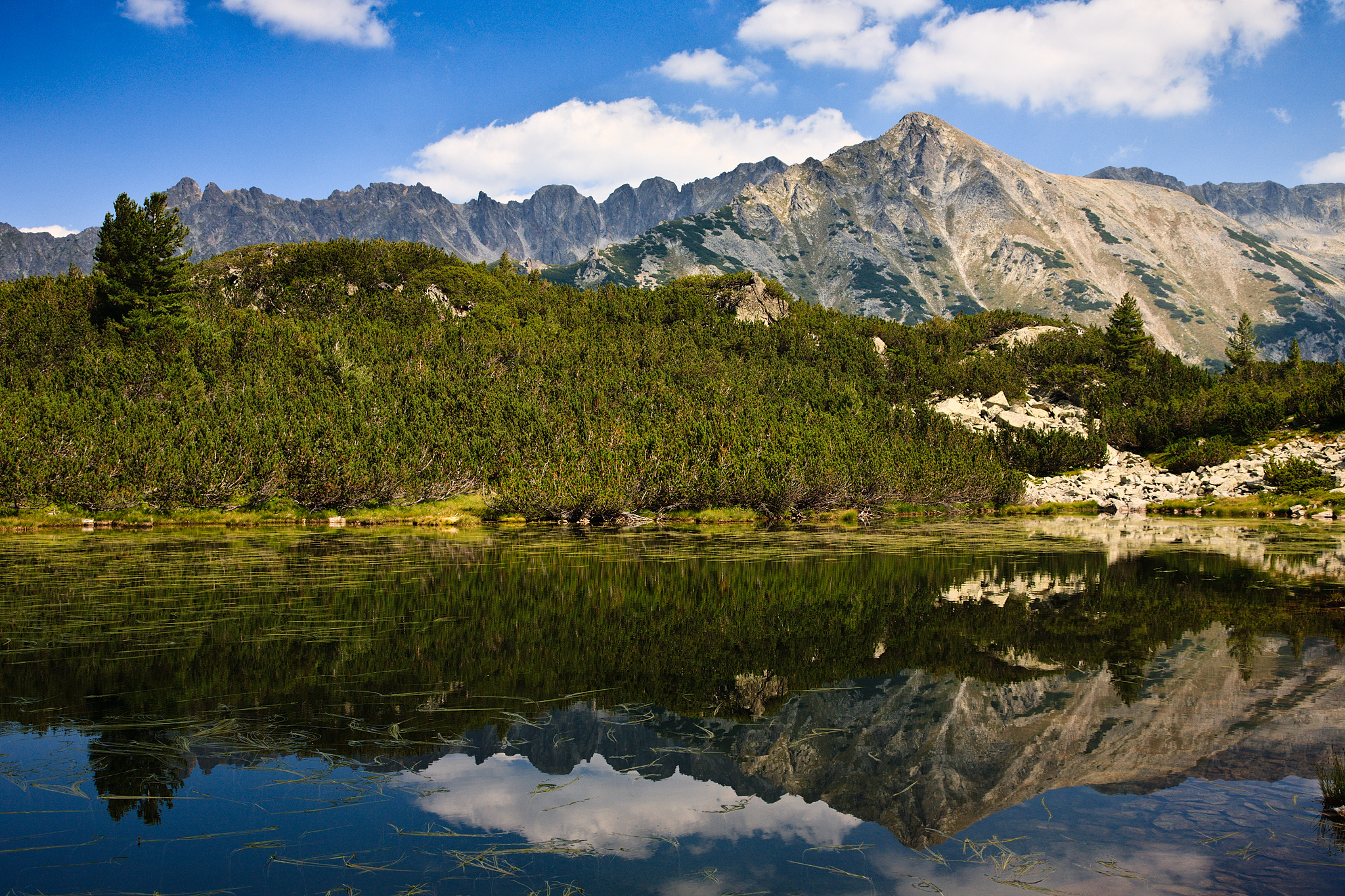
One of the Valyavishki Lakes and Gazey Summit

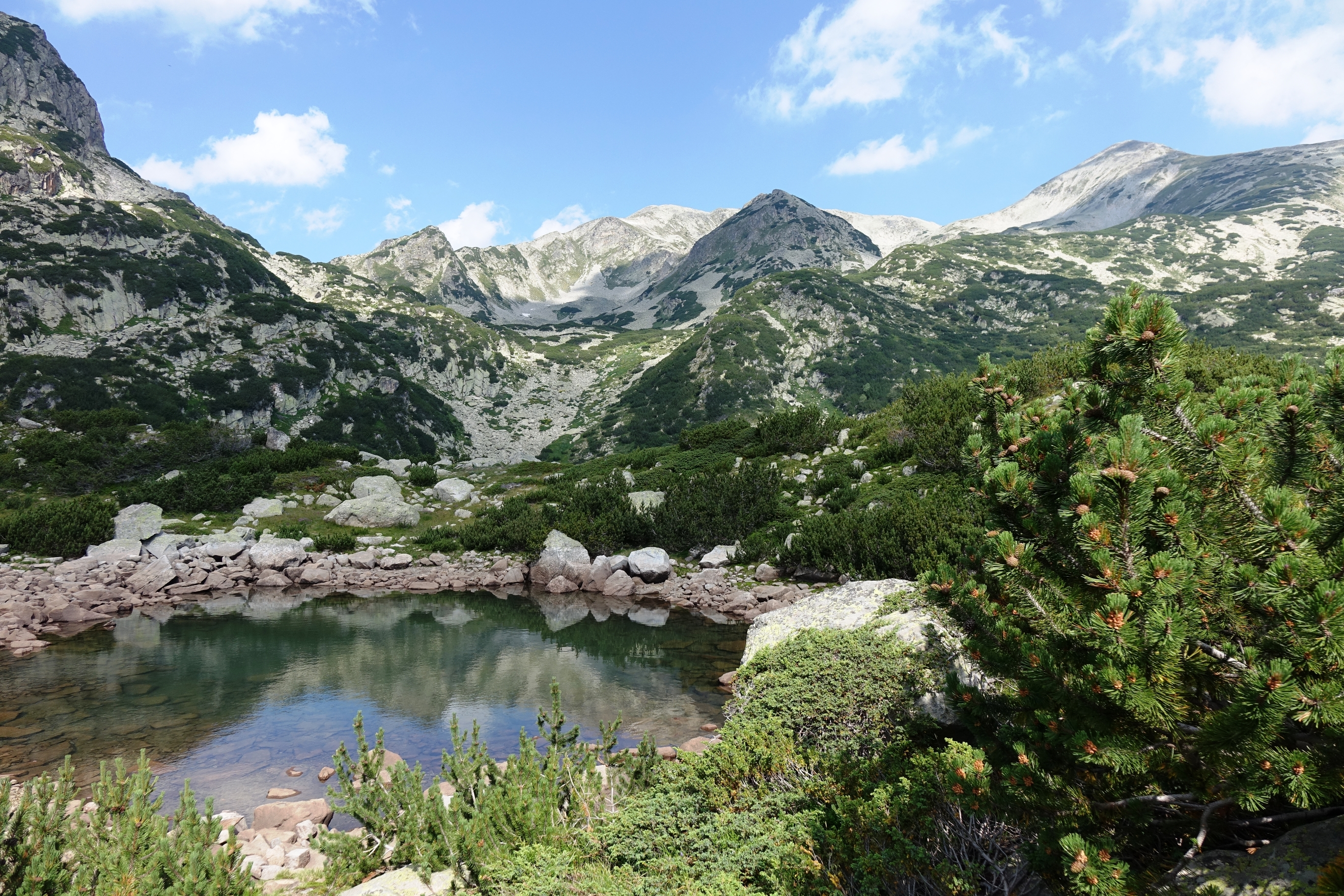
One of the Samodivski Lakes

Pirin forms the water divide between the basins of the rivers Struma and Mesta. The watershed follows the main ridge of the mountain in direction north-west to south-east. As the main ridge is situated closer to the Mesta valley, the tributaries to the Struma tend to be longer. The rivers are short, steep and with high water volume; the river bottom is rocky or covered with large sediments. The water discharge is highest in May and June and lowest in September. The streamflow is largely derived from snow melting and glacial lakes in spring and summer and almost exclusively from groundwater in winter. The rivers and streams form numerous leaps and waterfalls but they are generally not as high as those in Rila or the Balkan Mountains. The highest one is Popinolashki waterfall, measuring some 12 m. Pirin is the source of 10 tributaries to the Struma, including Pirinska Bistritsa, Sandanska Bistritsa, Melnishka reka and Vlahina reka, as well as another 10 to the Mesta, such as Iztok, Disilitsa and Retizhe. Reaching a length of 53 km, Pirinska Bistritsa is the longest river in the massif. Pirin has abundant mineral springs, being among Bulgaria's richest areas. Based on the chemical composition they are divided into two thermal groups — in the Mesta and the Struma basins. The springs in the Mesta basin to the east are more alkaline, with lower mineralisation (below 400 mg/L) and conductance; those on the western slopes reach higher temperatures, up to 86 °C.

A total of 176 glacial lakes are situated in the mountain range, all of them in North Pirin. Of them, 119 are permanent, and the rest dry out in summer. About 65% of them are located in the north-eastern area and discharge into the Mesta basin; the other 35% are to the south-west, their water flowing into the tributaries of the Struma. Approximately 90% of the lakes are nestled between 2,100 m and 2,450 m. At an altitude of 2,710 m the Upper Polezhan Lake is the highest in Pirin, as well as in Bulgaria and the Balkan Peninsula. The total area of all lakes is 1.8 km^{2}; the largest one being Popovo Lake with 123,600 m^{2}, which makes it the fourth largest glacial lake in the country. With a depth of 29.5 m, it is also Pirin's deepest lake and Bulgaria's second. The water is transparent as deep as 15 m. Many of the lakes are covered with ice during most of the year. The ice thickness reaches 3 m in the highest lakes. The lakes and the lake groups are:

- Popovo Lakes – 11
- Kremenski Lakes – 5
- Banderishki Lakes – 16
- Vasilashki Lakes – 12
- Valyavishki Lakes – 10
- Chairski Lakes – 10
- Vlahini Lakes – 5
- Malokamenishki Lakes – 34
- Prevalski Lakes – 4
- Bashliyski Lakes – 4
- Polezhanski Lakes – 2
- Tipitski Lakes – 2
- Sinanishko Lake
- Bezbozhko Lake
- Salzitsa Lake

Pirin is also home to two small glaciers, remnants from the last Ice Age. Snezhnika is located in the deep Golemiya Kazan cirque at the steep northern foot of Vihren and is the southernmost glacier in Europe. Banski Suhodol Glacier is larger and situated a bit to the north below Koncheto Ridge.

== Nature ==
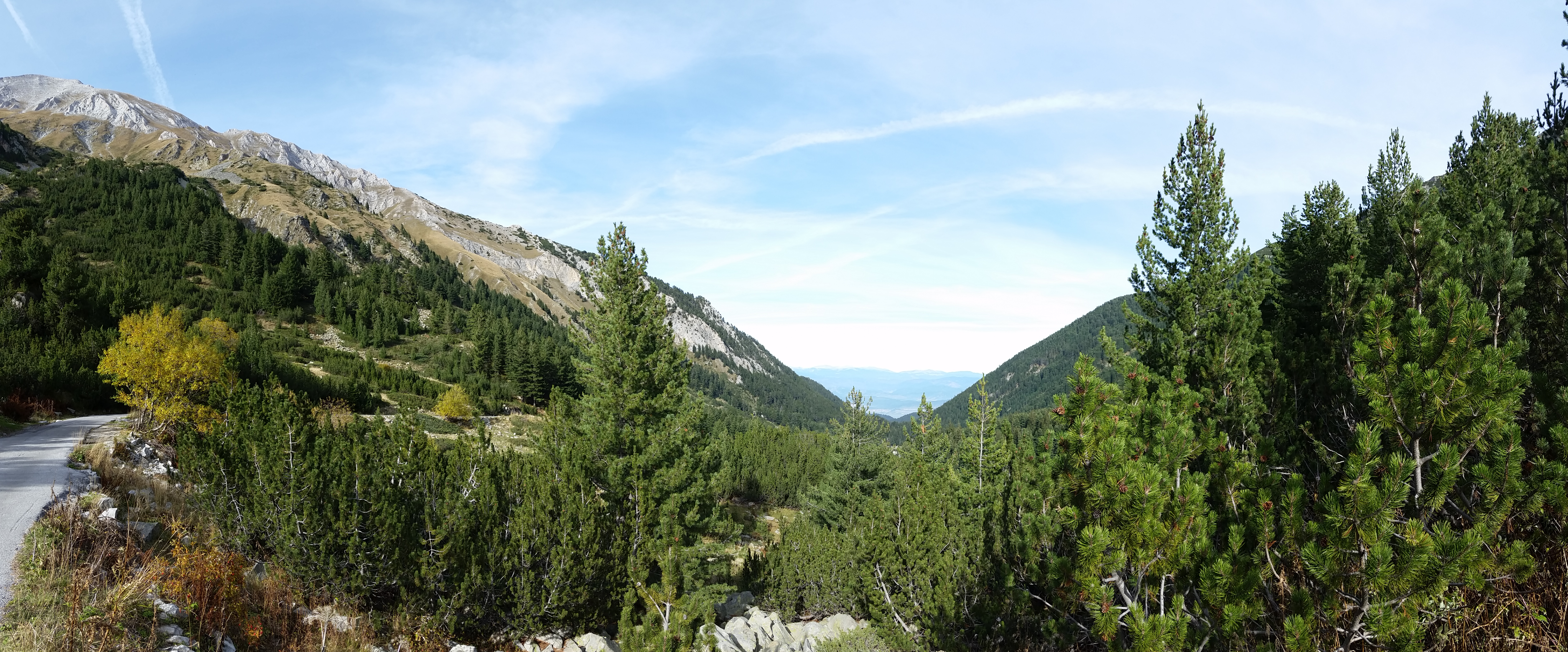
A panorama of Pirin

The vegetation of Pirin is vertically divided into five distinct elevation zones: Mediterranean, deciduous, coniferous, that combined form the tree line reaching approximately altitude of 2,000 m, shrubs forming the subalpine line up to 2,500 m and alpine meadows, also known as the alpine line above 2,500 m. The Mediterranean zone is dominated, among other, by pubescent oak (Quercus pubescens) and Oriental Hornbeam (Carpinus orientalis), the deciduous zone by European oak (Quercus robur) and European beech (Fagus sylvatica), and the coniferous — by Macedonian pine (Pinus peuce), Bosnian pine (Pinus heldreichii) and Scots pine (Pinus sylvestris). The subalpine line is mainly covered with dwarf mountain pine (Pinus mugo) and common juniper (Juniperus communis). The alpine line is covered with grass, moss, lichen and abundant in bilberries and rare flowers such as the edelweiss (Leontopodium alpinum). Pirin is home to Bulgaria's oldest tree, the 1300–year Baikushev's pine — a Bosnian pine that is a contemporary of the foundation of the Bulgarian state in 681 AD.

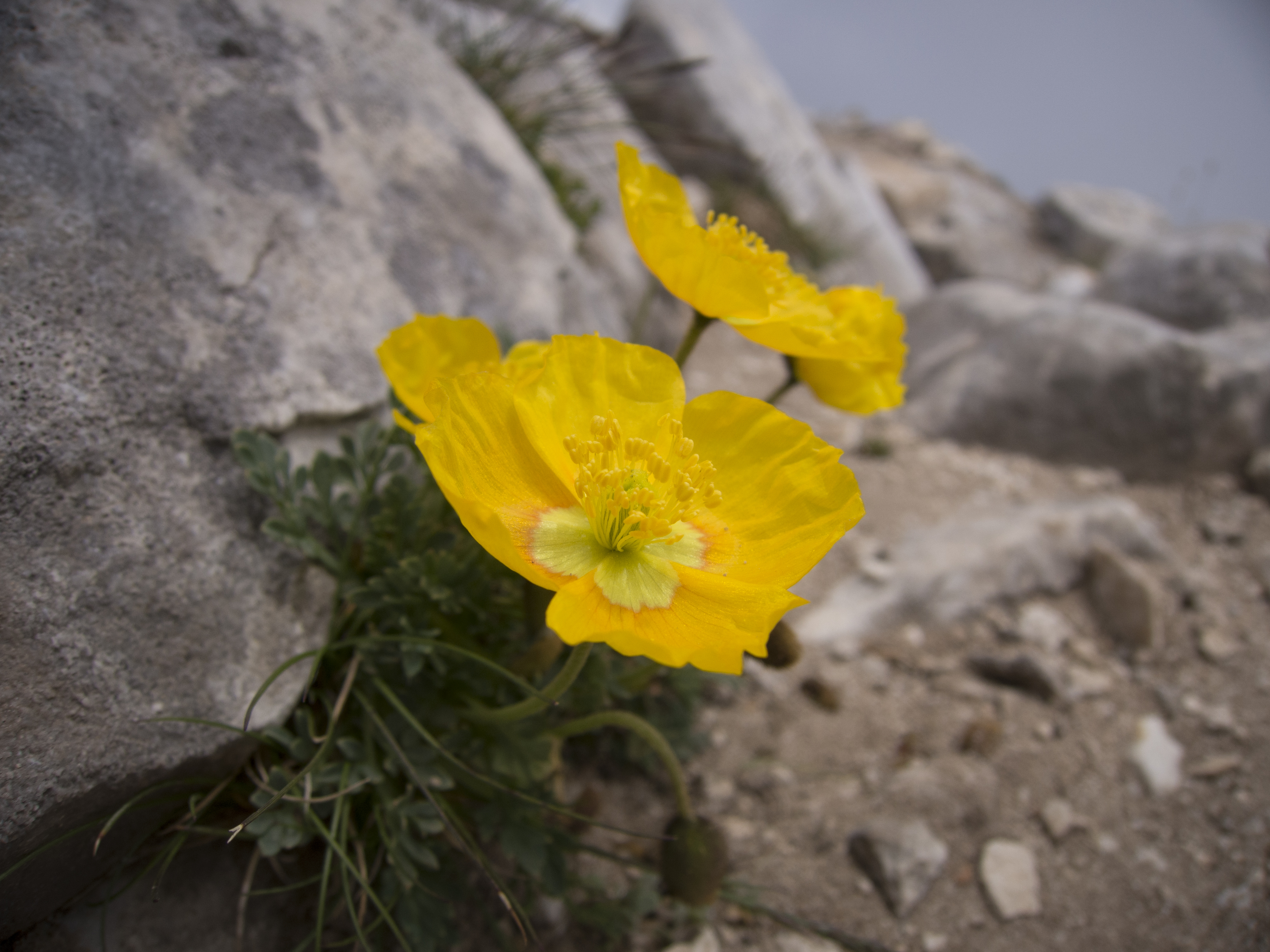
The endemic Pirin poppy (Papaver degenii) under Vihren

The total number of vascular plants is 1315 species, or approximately 1/3 of Bulgaria's flora, many of them being rare and under protection. There are 18 species endemic to Pirin, including Pirin poppy (Papaver degenii), Kozhuharov oksitropis (Oxytropis kozhuharovii), Urumov oksitropis (Oxytropis urumovii) among others, as well as another 17 taxa restricted only to Bulgaria, which makes a total of 35 Bulgarian endemic species. The endemic genus Pirinia is named after the mountain range, containing a single species Pirinia koenigii restricted to Pirin. The non-vascular plants are represented by 165 algae, 329 moss and 367 lichen species.

The vertebrate fauna of Pirin consists of 229 species. The mammal species are 45 and include brown bear, gray wolf, wildcat, European pine marten, wild boar, red deer, roe deer and chamois. The total number of bird species is 159, including three relicts — boreal owl, white-backed woodpecker and Eurasian three-toed woodpecker, and a number of birds of prey, such as lesser spotted eagle, booted eagle, golden eagle, short-toed snake eagle, saker falcon, peregrine falcon, etc. There are 11 reptile, 8 amphibian and 6 fish species. The number of invertebrate species discovered so far is 2091 but they remain poorly studied and are expected to rise to 4500.

The rich wildlife in the mountain is protected by the Pirin National Park founded in 1962 and designated a UNESCO World Heritage Site in 1983. The park spans an area of 403,32 km^{2} and includes two nature reserves, Bayuvi Dupki–Dzhindzhiritsa and Yulen. There are two more reserves in Pirin beyond the limits of the national park, Tisata and Orelyak.

== History ==
Due to the fertile foothills and the favourable terrain for defence Pirin has been continuously inhabited since prehistoric times. Archaeological remains left by the Thracians have been discovered at the western foothills along the Struma Valley and in the Razlog Valley. As the region was annexed by the Roman Empire by the 1st century BC the number of settlements saw further expansion. During the Early Middle Ages the area around Pirin was settled by Slavic tribes along with most of the Balkans and was absorbed by the Bulgarian Empire in the 9th century. Throughout the Middle Ages Pirin remained contested between the Bulgarian and the Byzantine Empires until it was conquered by the Ottoman Turks in the late 14th century. The population of the region played an active role during the Bulgarian National Revival and the struggle for national liberation. The important 18th century Bulgarian enlightener Paisius of Hilendar and author of Istoriya Slavyanobolgarskaya was born in Bansko at the northern foothills of Pirin. Bulgaria achieved liberation in 1878 but as a result of the Congress of Berlin Pirin remained in the Ottoman Empire. In response, the local population in Pirin rebelled in the Kresna–Razlog uprising (1878–1879) and later took part in the Ilinden–Preobrazhenie Uprising (1903) but both were quelled by the Ottomans. The region was finally liberated by the Bulgarian Army in October 1912 during the course of the First Balkan War (1912–1913).

== Settlements, transportation and economy ==
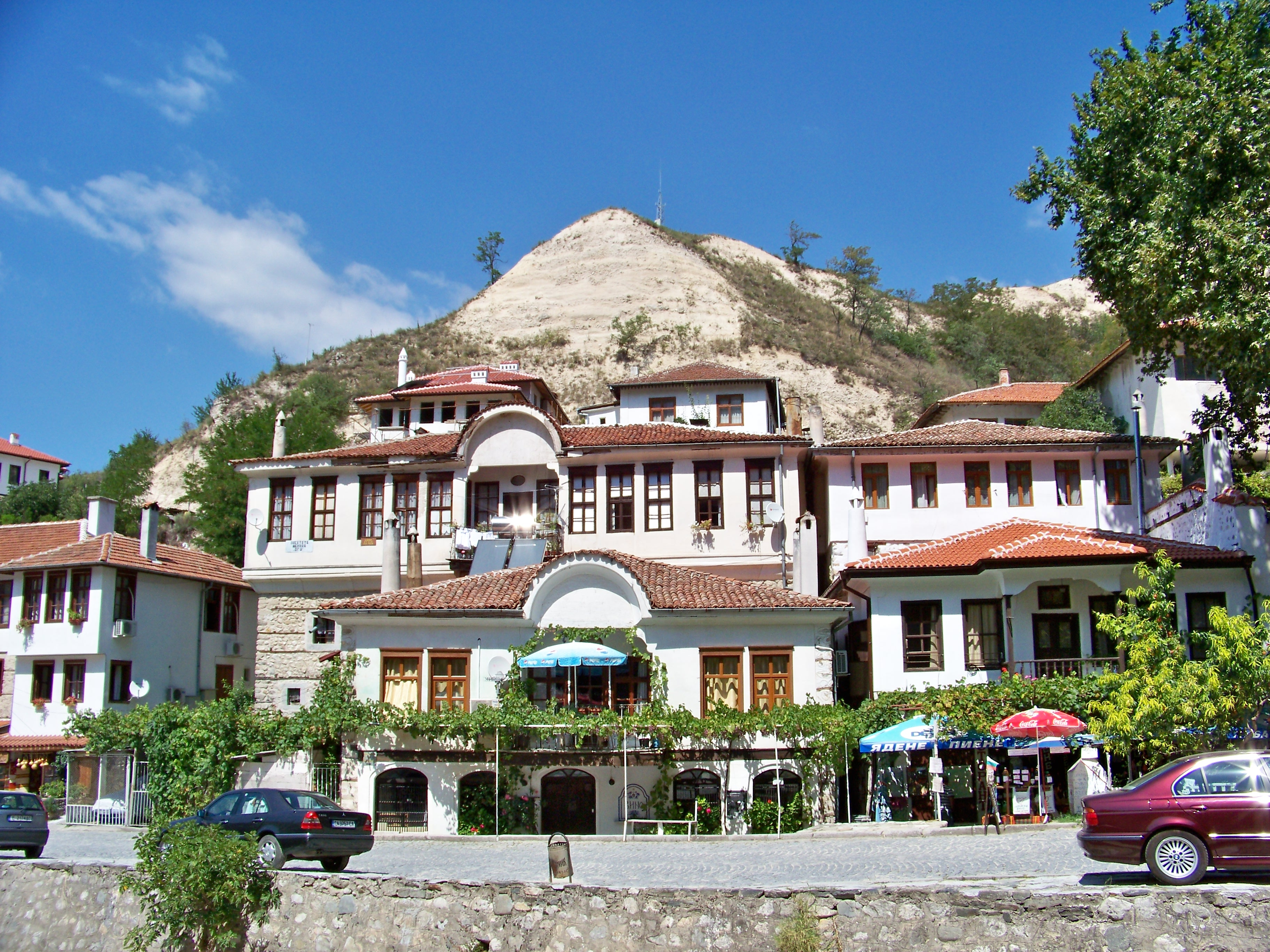
Melnik, the nation's smallest town, is a centre of wine production and one of the 100 Tourist Sites of Bulgaria

Pirin is a sparsely populated mountain range with all the settlements located at the foothills and none in the mountain itself. Administratively it falls entirely in Blagoevgrad Province. From north to south there are four towns at the western foothills facing the Struma Valley, namely Simitli (pop. 6,647 as of 2016), Kresna (3,267), Sandanski (26,023) and Melnik (170), as well as three more to the north and the east — Bansko (7,369), Dobrinishte (2,377) and Gotse Delchev (19,087). There are a number of villages, including among others Brezhani, Vlahi, Ploski, Lilyanovo, Dzhigurovo, Gorna Sushitsa, Kashina, Pirin, Belyovo, Novo Delchevo, Kremen, Breznitsa, Dobrotino, Kornitsa, Lazhnitsa, etc.

Pirin is served by two main roads — the first class I-1 road, part of European route E79, along the Struma valley to the west that links the capital Sofia and the provincial centre Blagoevgrad with Greece at Kulata, and the second class II-19 road which branches off I-1 at Simitly, goes east crossing the Predel Saddle and then turns south along the Mesta Valley to Gotse Delchev and the border with Greece at Ilinden. The Struma motorway is planned to run in parallel with the I-1 road, with one section between Novo Delchevo and the border already finished and another one linking Novo Delchevo and Kresna under construction as of 2017. Due to the rugged relief Pirin is crossed by only one road, the third class III-198 road that links I-1 and II-19 through the Paril Saddle between Central and South Pirin. The mountain range is served by the Bulgarian State Railways via railway line No. 5 along the Struma Valley in the west and the Septemvri–Dobrinishte narrow-gauge line with terminus at the latter town in the northern foothills.

The economy is based on agriculture, industry, services and tourism. There are small deposits of sub-bituminous coal as well as significant quantities of high-quality marble that is processed in Sandanski and part of the production is exported. A number of small hydro power plants have been constructed, mainly along Sandanska Bistritsa River. The rivers are also used for irrigation. Forests cover 1,996 km^{2} (771 sq mi), or 5.5% of Bulgaria's total, and are of commercial importance because of the high-quality timber. As logging is restricted in the protected areas the wood-processing industry in Pirin forms 3.5% of the nation's total production in that sector. The lower parts of the mountain offer favourable conditions for agriculture, the most important cash crops being grapes, peanuts, tobacco and anise. The region around Melnik is renowned for its centuries-old traditions in producing distinct red wines. Manufacturing industry is centred in Sandanski, Gotse Delchev, Bansko and Simitli; the main sectors are food processing, machine building and furniture production.

== Tourism ==
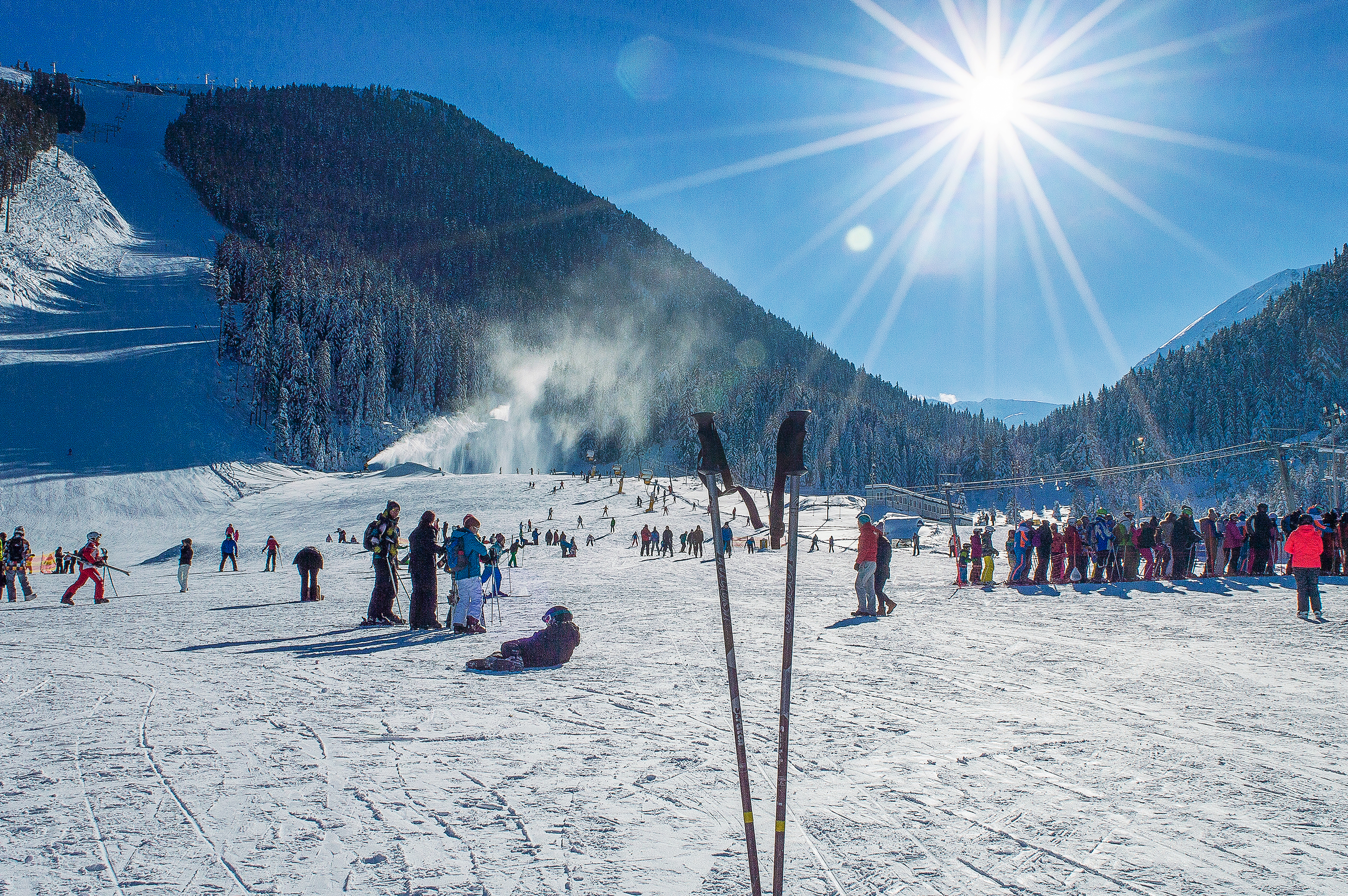
A ski zone in Bansko

The favourable natural conditions for winter sports, spa and recreation combined with the architectural heritage make Pirin a popular tourist destination. Bansko is by far the most developed winter resort in the mountain range, being also Bulgaria's most popular one for foreigners — over 79,000 foreign tourists have stayed in Bansko for the 2016/17 winter season spending an average of four nights. Bansko has 75 km ski runs equipped with artificial snow machines as well as 22 km lifting facilities and provides conditions for alpine skiing, cross-country skiing, biathlon, snowboard, etc. The top elevation is 2,560 m while the lowest is 990 m. Bansko regularly hosts European alpine ski and biathlon cups. Another much smaller resort is Dobriniste with 5 km of ski tracks.

The abundant mineral springs are a prerequisite for health and spa tourism. The most developed spa resorts are Dobrinishte and Sandanski. The former has 17 springs with a total discharge of 782 L/min and temperature of 28°С to 41.2°С and has a mineral beach among the other facilities. Sandanski is home to 11 springs with a total discharge of 1200 L/min and temperature of 33°С to 83°С that have been utilised since Antiquity. Other mineral baths are located in Bansko, Banya, Vlahi, Dolna Gradeshnitsa, Levunovo, Marikostinovo, Musomishta, Oshtava, Simitli and Hotovo.

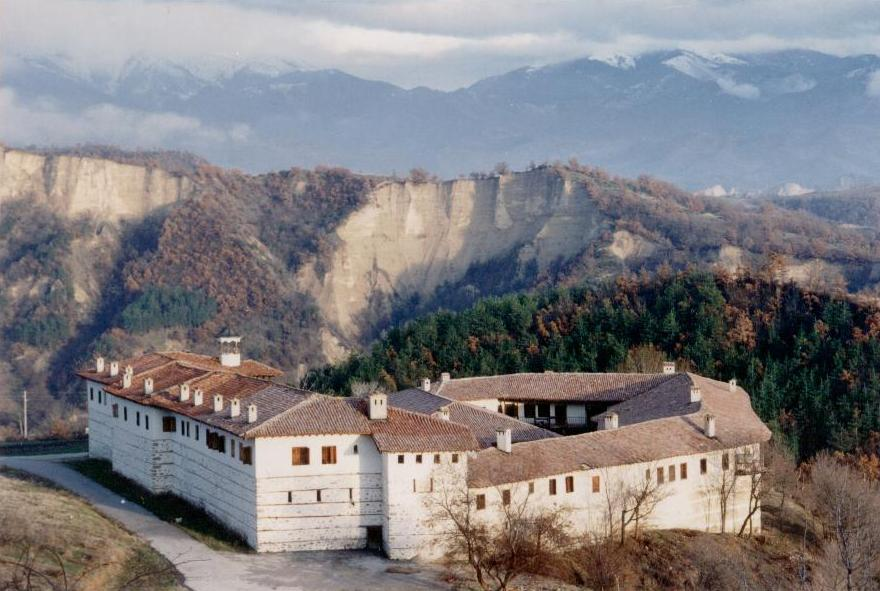
Rozhen Monastery

There are 20 marked hiking trails within the borders of Pirin National Park. The steep rock faces in Northern Pirin provide favourable conditions for alpine climbing. The most popular places for practising climbing are the north wall of Vihren, as well as the peaks Kamenitsa, Banski Suhodol, Sinanitsa and Dzhengal among others. Pirin Golf Club near Bansko has 18- and 5-hole golf courses.

Cultural tourism is also well developed. Melnik has been designated an architectural reserve and one of the 100 Tourist Sites of Bulgaria. Among the main sights are the ruins of the medieval fortress and the Church of St Nicholas, as well as a number of national revival style houses, such as the Kordopulov House. A few kilometres to the east of the town is Rozhen Monastery, the biggest one in Pirin. The monastery was established in the early 13th century during the Second Bulgarian Empire and has the shape of an irregular hexagon. There are frescoes dated from the 16th century. Rozhen Monastery was a regional centre for learning and calligraphy. In close proximity to the monastery is the Church of Saints Cyril and Methodius, built on the initiative of the Prominent Bulgarian revolutionary Yane Sandanski, which nowadays houses his tomb. The town of Sandanski boasts the ruins of a 5-6th century episcopal basilica that has been recently renovated. Bansko also has an old quarter with 18-19th century houses and the Church of Holy Trinity whose 30-meters high belfry is the symbol of the town.

== Honour ==
Pirin Glacier on Graham Land in Antarctica is named after Pirin Mountain.

== Gallery ==
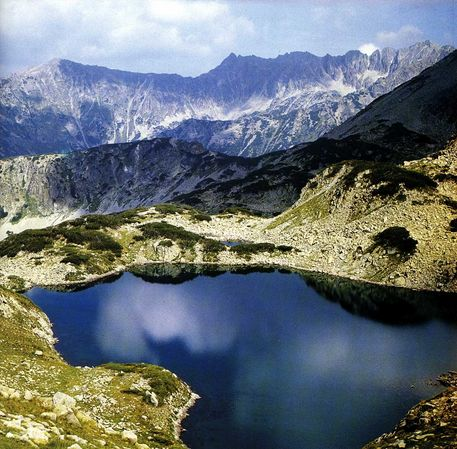
Upper Vasilashko Lake

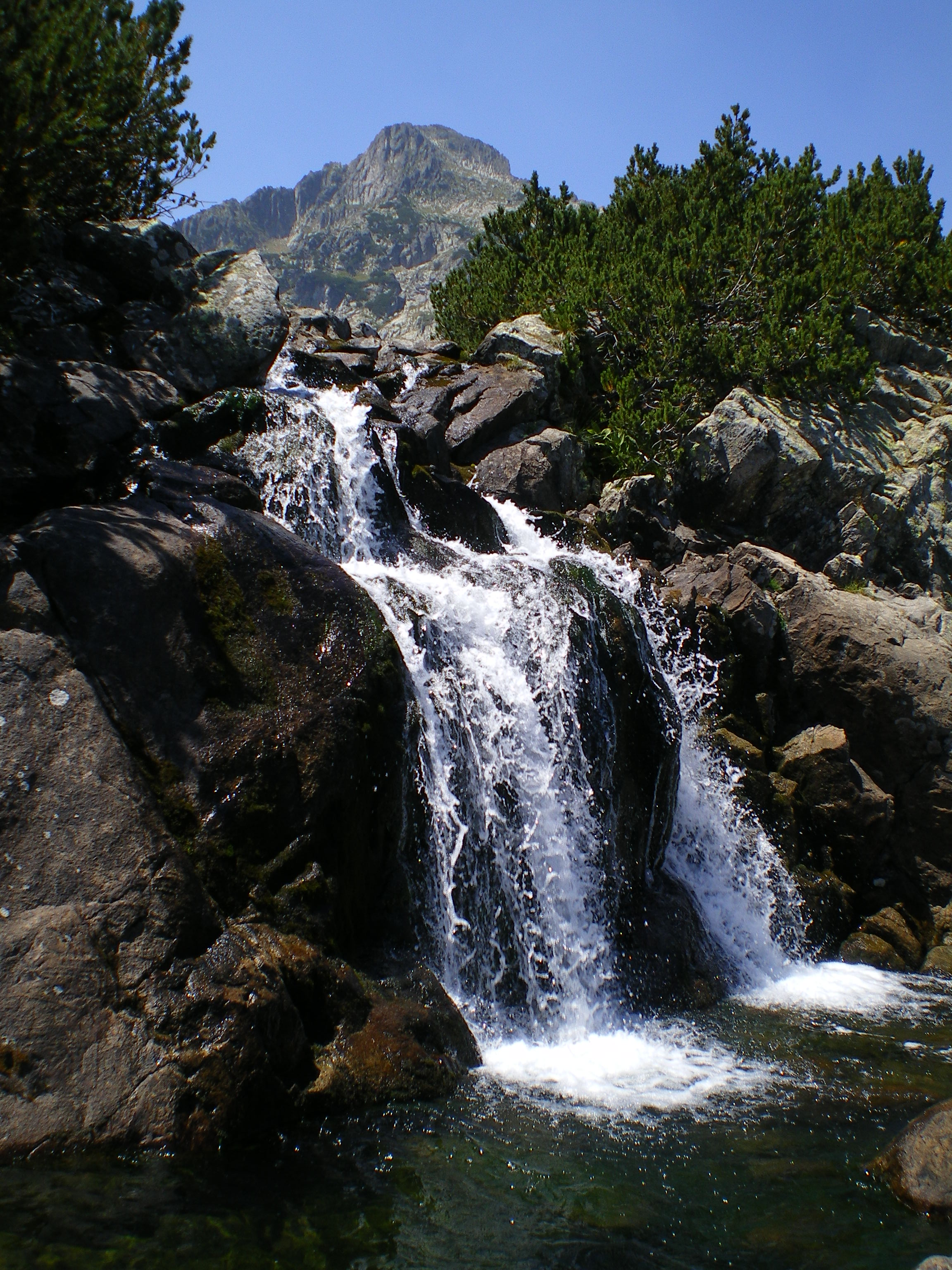
Popinolashki waterfall

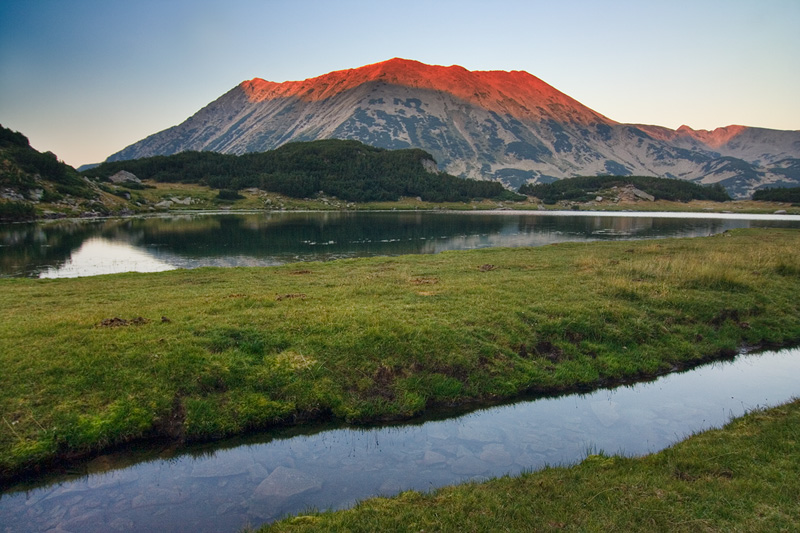
Todorka Peak

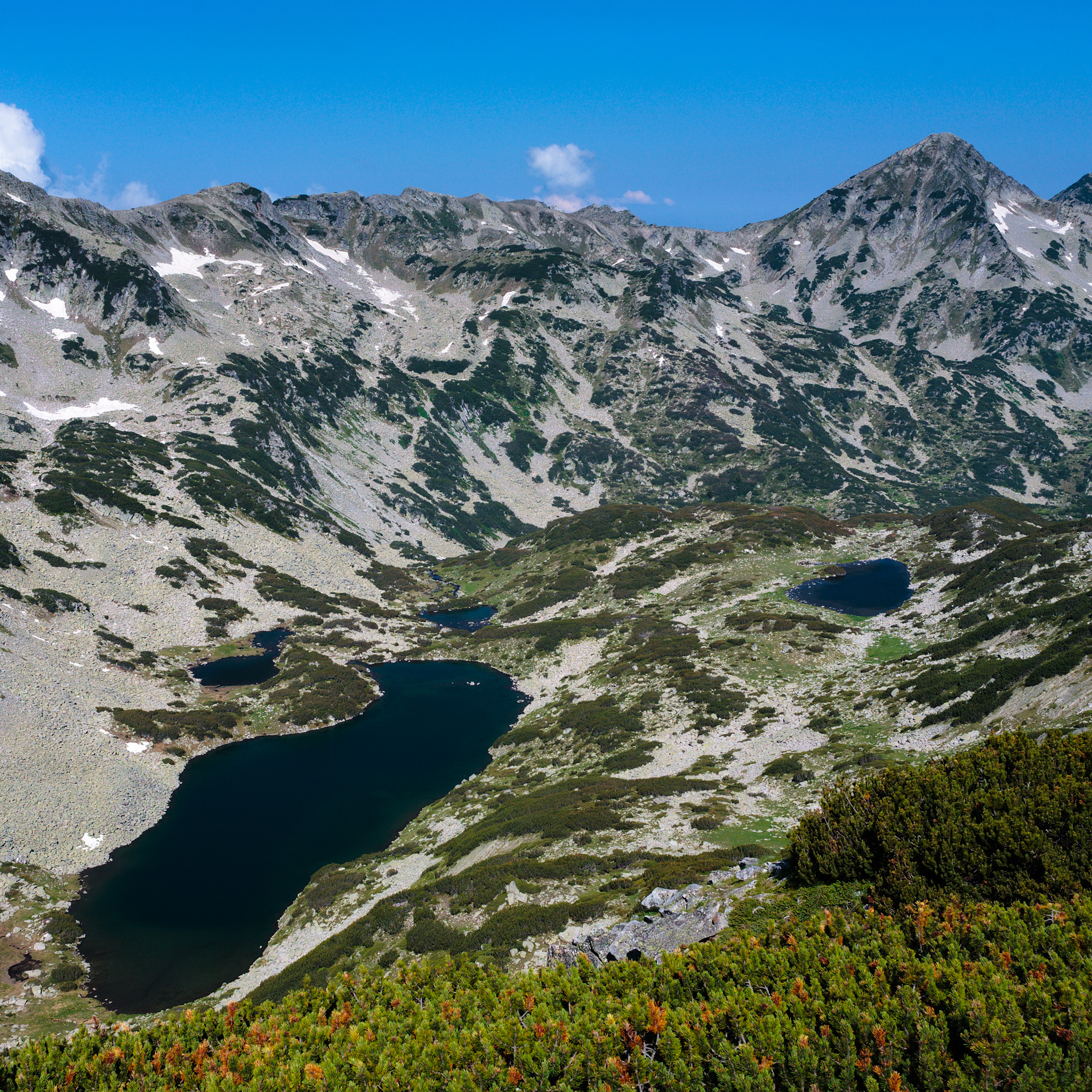
Banderishki Lakes

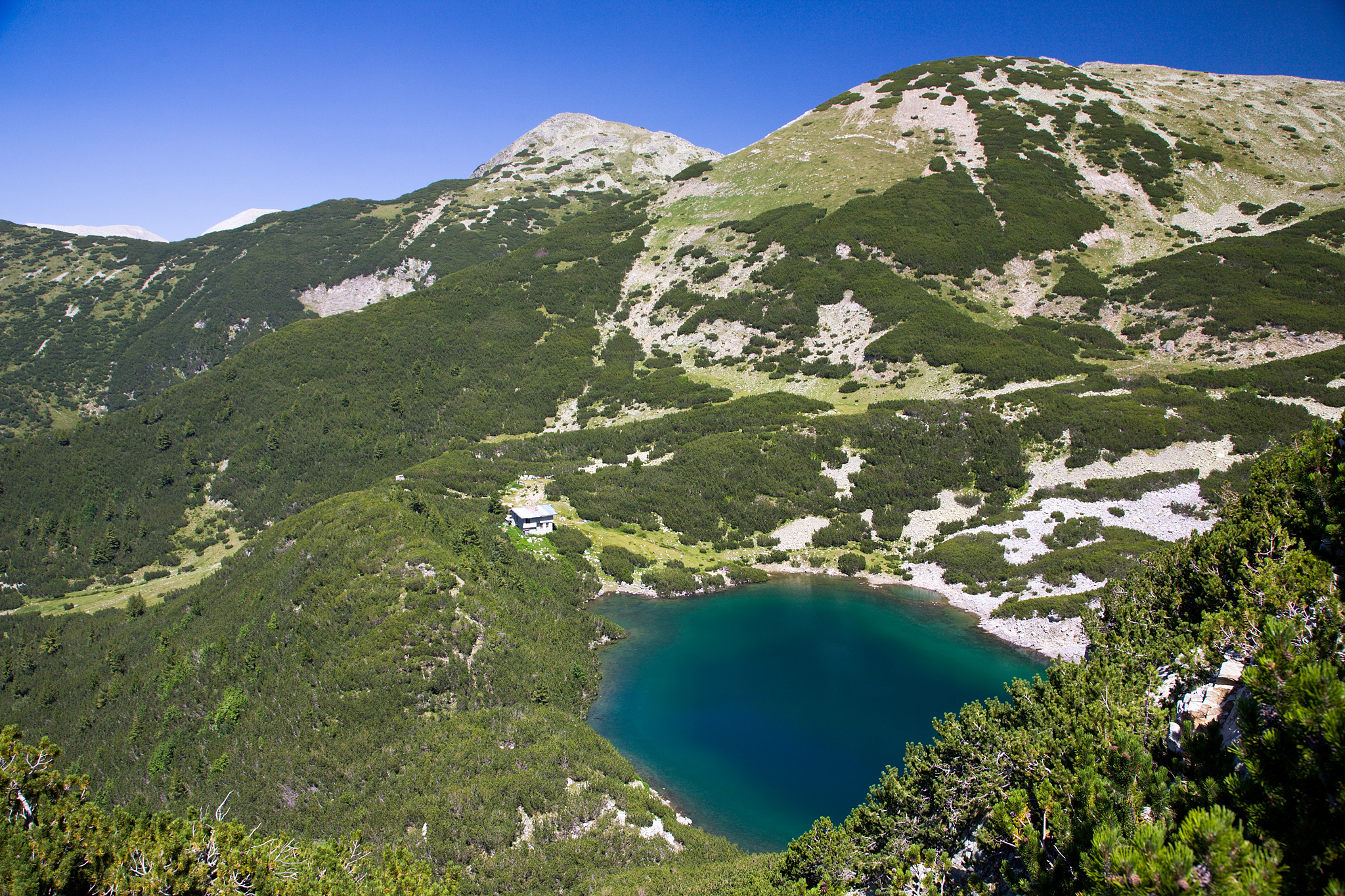
Sinanitsa Lake

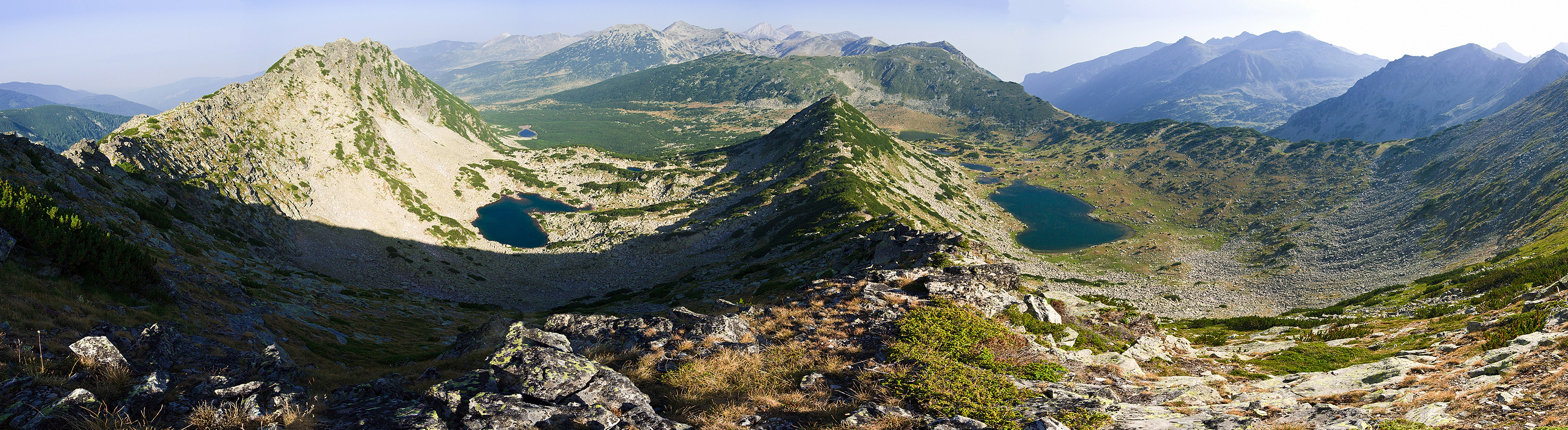
A panoramic view of Pirin

== See also ==
- Geography of Bulgaria
- Pirin National Park
- Southernmost glacial mass in Europe
- List of mountains in Bulgaria
- List of mountains of the Balkans
- List of European ultra-prominent peaks
- List of the highest European ultra-prominent peaks
- List of World Heritage Sites in Bulgaria
- Rila
- Rhodope Mountains
- Slavyanka (mountain)
- Osogovo-Belasitsa mountain group

== Sources ==
- Головински (Golovinski), Евгени (Evgeni); et al. (2003). Българска енциклопедия "А-Я" [Bulgarian Encyclopaedia "A-Ya"] (in Bulgarian). Sofia: Издателство "Труд" (Trud Press). ISBN 954-528-313-0.
- Георгиев (Georgiev), Владимир (Vladimir); et al. (1986). Енциклопедия България [Encyclopaedia Bulgaria] (in Bulgarian). Vol. V. P-R. Sofia: Издателство на БАН (Bulgarian Academy of Sciences Press).
- Мичев (Michev), Николай (Nikolay); Михайлов (Mihaylov), Цветко (Tsvetko); Вапцаров (Vaptsarov), Иван (Ivan); Кираджиев (Kiradzhiev), Светлин (Svetlin) (1980). Географски речник на България [Geographic Dictionary of Bulgaria] (in Bulgarian). Sofia: Наука и култура (Nauka i kultura).
- Димитрова (Dimitrova), Людмила (Lyudmila) (2004). Национален парк "Пирин". План за управление [Pirin National Park. Management Plan] (in Bulgarian). и колектив. Sofia: Ministry of Environment and Water, Bulgarian Foundation "Biodiversity".
- Дончев (Donchev), Дончо (Doncho); Каракашев (Karakashev), Христо (Hristo) (2004). Теми по физическа и социално-икономическа география на България [Topics on Physical and Social-Economic Geography of Bulgaria] (in Bulgarian). Sofia: Ciela. ISBN 954-649-717-7.
- Душков (Dushkov), Добри (Dobri) (1972). Пирин. Туристически речник [Pirin. Tourist Dictionary] (in Bulgarian). Sofia: Наука и култура (Nauka i kultura).
- Малчев (Malchev), Малчо (Malcho); Сотиров (Sotirov), Чавдар (Chavdar) (2015). Планински туризъм [Mountain Tourism] (in Bulgarian). Shumen: Университетско издетелство "Епископ Константин Преславски" (Shumen University Press). ISBN 978-954-577-899-5.
- Perry, Julian (2010). Walking in Bulgaria's National Parks. Cicerone. ISBN 978-1-85284-574-2.
- Gachev, Emil (2011). "Inter-annual size variations of Snezhnika Glacieret (the Pirin Mountains, Bulgaria) in the last ten years" (PDF). Studia Geomorphologica Carpatho-Balcanica. XLV. Polish Academy of Sciences: 47–68. ISSN 0081-6434.
- Grunewald, Karsten; Scheithauer, Jörg (2010). "Europe's southernmost glaciers: response and adaptation to climate change" (PDF). Journal of Glaciology. 56 (195). International Glaciological Society: 129–142. Bibcode:2010JGlac..56..129G. doi:10.3189/002214310791190947. ISSN 0022-1430. S2CID 130305078. Archived from the original (PDF) on 2 April 2015.
