= Banderishki Lakes =

Group of lakes in Bulgaria

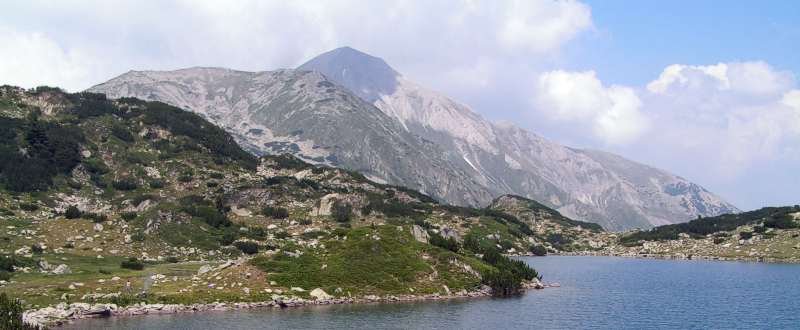
Pirin's highest peak, Vihren, seen from the Long lake.

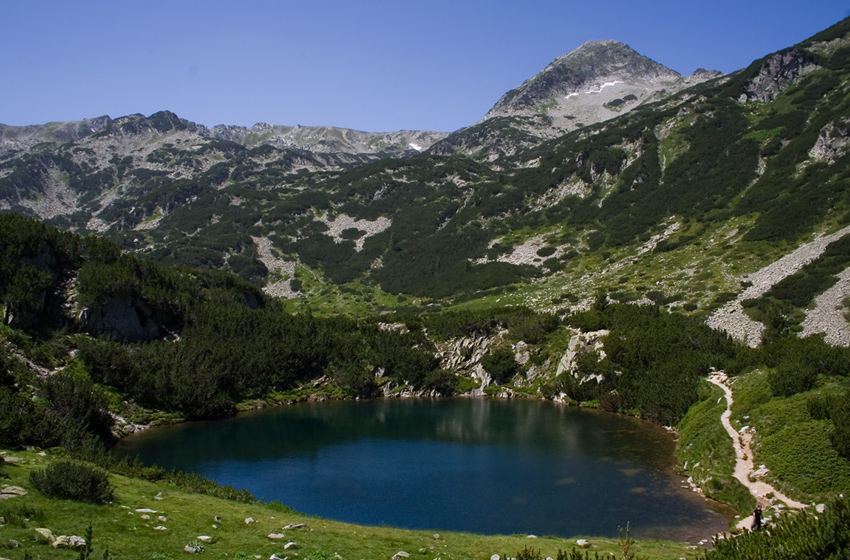
A view of the Okoto lake.

The Banderishki Lakes are a large group of lakes in the Pirin mountains in southwestern Bulgaria. They are situated in the Banderitsa valley and mark the beginning of the Banderitsa river. There are 17 lakes in all but only 5 have names. They are glacial lakes formed on granite basis with a total area of 126,7 decares. The temperature of the water in July is 10 to 12° С.

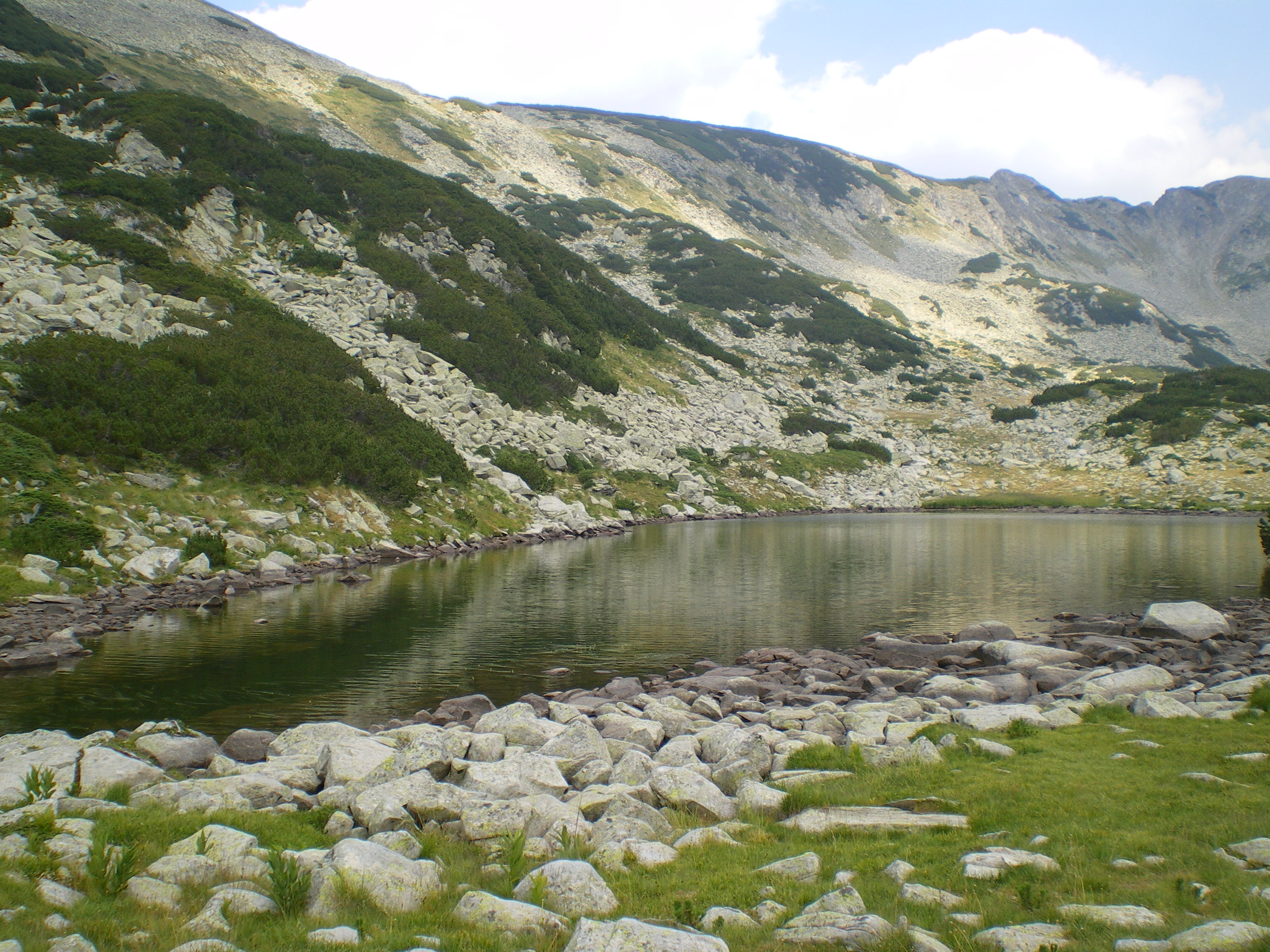
The Frog lake.

- The Frog lake (Bulgarian: Жабешко езеро) is the highest in the group, nestling on the southern slope of the Malka Todorka peak at an altitude of 2,322 m. Its surface is only 5,6 decares and is 2 m deep. The lake is elongated (138x63 m), the water is warm.
- The Long lake (Bulgarian: Дългото езеро) is situated at 2,310 m and is called the Upper Banderishko lake. It is 450 m long and 150 m wide and has a surface area of 45,5 decares. The maximum depth is 10 m and the volume of water is 177,000 m³.
- The Fish Banderishko lake (Bulgarian: Рибно Бъндеришко езеро) is located at 2,190 m. Fish are abundant in the lake, and this is where its name is derived from. With its surface of 65 decares (384x230 m) the lake is the largest in the valley. Its depth is 12,2 m. South of the lake the river drops down a steep slope which separates it from the Long lake, and to the north there is a small peninsular with pine-scrub.
- The Muratovo lake (Bulgarian: Муратово езеро), also known as the Juniper lake, is situated below the Moratov peak in a small cirque. There are three tiny lakes around it. Its altitude is 2,230 m and has an area of 12,3 decares. The lake is only 3,2 m deep and the amount of water is 22,700 m³. In front of the lake is the Todorka peak.
- The Eye lake (Bulgarian: Окото) is a small lake located above the Vihren refuge, the lowest in the group (2,062 m). Its name is due to its rounded shape and shining surface. It is so small that it can only be seen on the track at a distance of 100 m. Its area is 2,6 decares, the depth is 5,4 m and the amount of water- 6,600 m³.
