= Tipitski Lakes =

Lakes in Bulgaria

Coordinates: 41°43′34″N 23°27′26″E

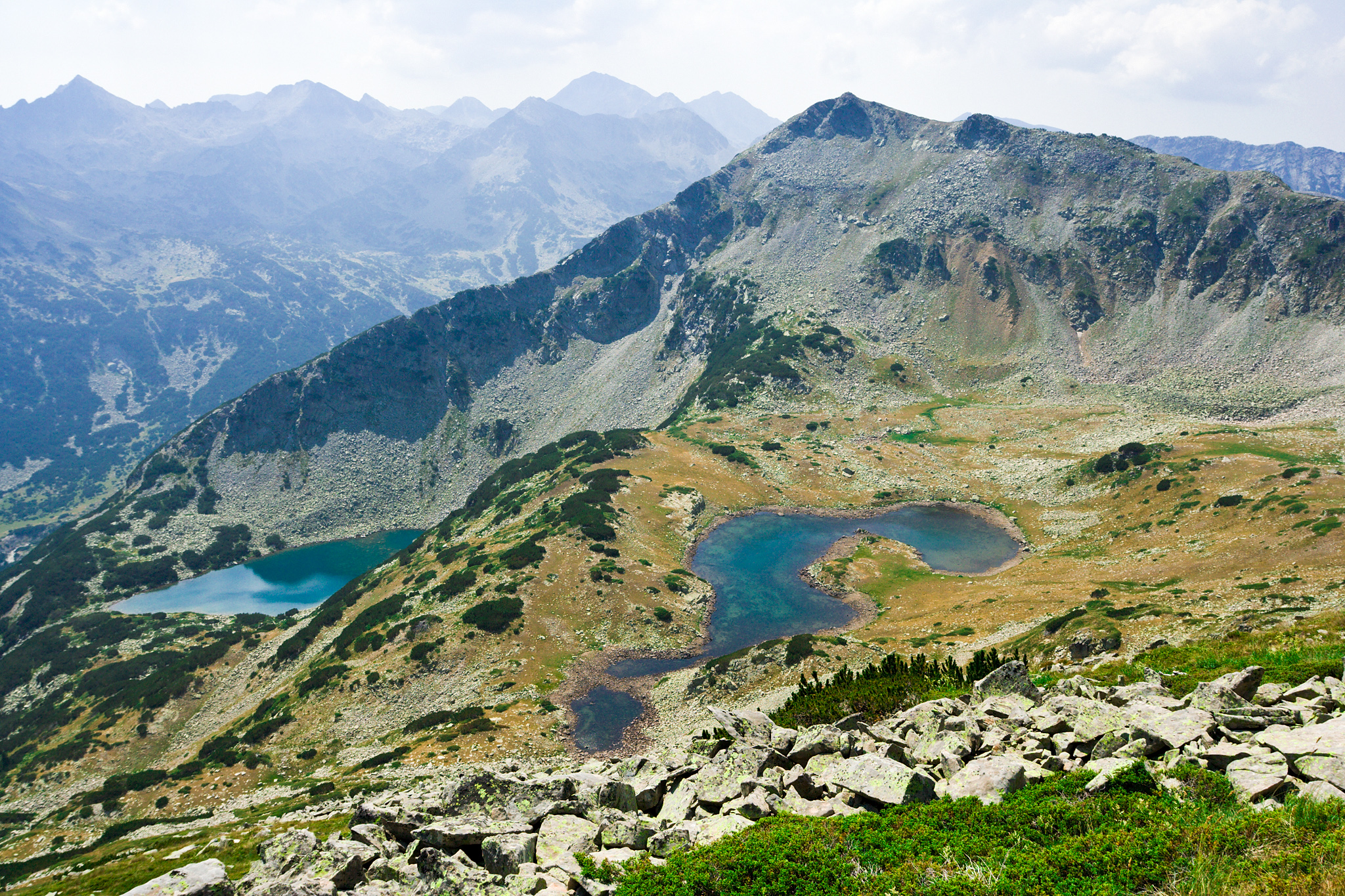
- Interactive map of Tipitski Lakes
- Location: Pirin, Bulgaria

The Tipits Lakes (Bulgarian: Типицки езера) are two lakes that are located in the Tipits cirque of the Northern Pirin mountains of Bulgaria.

The upper lake has a surface area of 17,7 decares and is 2,3 m deep; while the Lower lake has a surface area of 15,9 decares and depth of 9 m. There is also a smaller lake which drys up. The two bigger lakes are not connected and their water pours out from separate streams. There is trout in the lakes.
