= Chairski Lakes =

Group of lakes in Bulgaria

Coordinates: 41°42′15″N 23°27′21″E

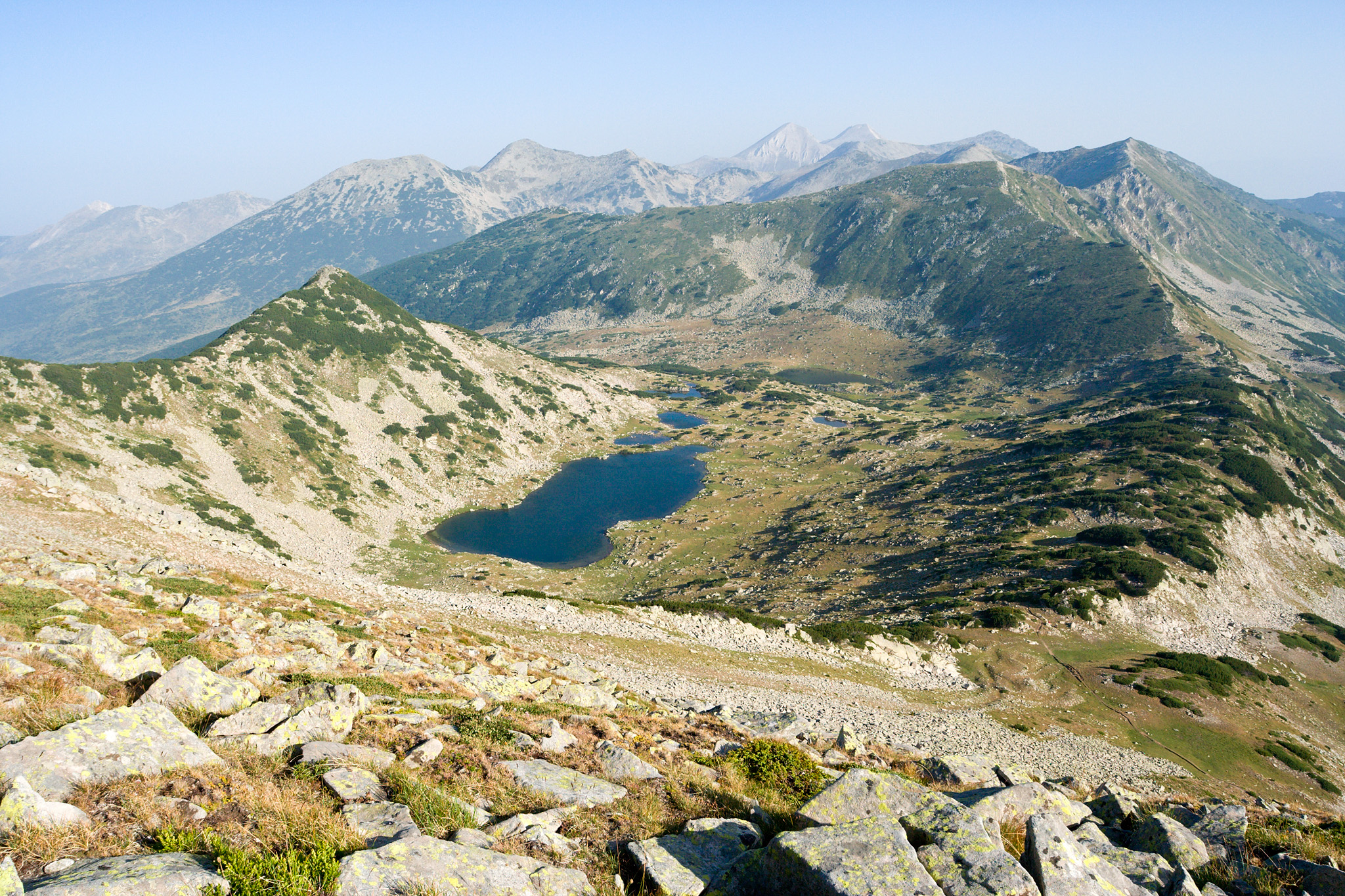
The eastern group of the lakes.

The Chairski Lakes (Bulgarian: Чаирски езера) are a group of nine glacial lakes in the Pirin mountain, south-western Bulgaria. They are located in a large cirque called Chaira in the valley of the river Sandanska Bistritsa. They are situated between the peaks Mozgovishki and Prevalski Chukar at an altitude between 1,400 and 1,500 m. Their total area is around 92 decares which is with 30 decares less than the largest lake in Pirin, the Popovo Lake. Their total volume is 160,000 m³ which is eight time less than the Popovo lake.

The tourist route from the Demyanitsa refuge to the Yana Sandanski refuge goes near the Chairski lakes.
