= Malak Polezhan =

One of Bulgaria's Pirin Mountains

Malak Polezhan (Малък Полежан)
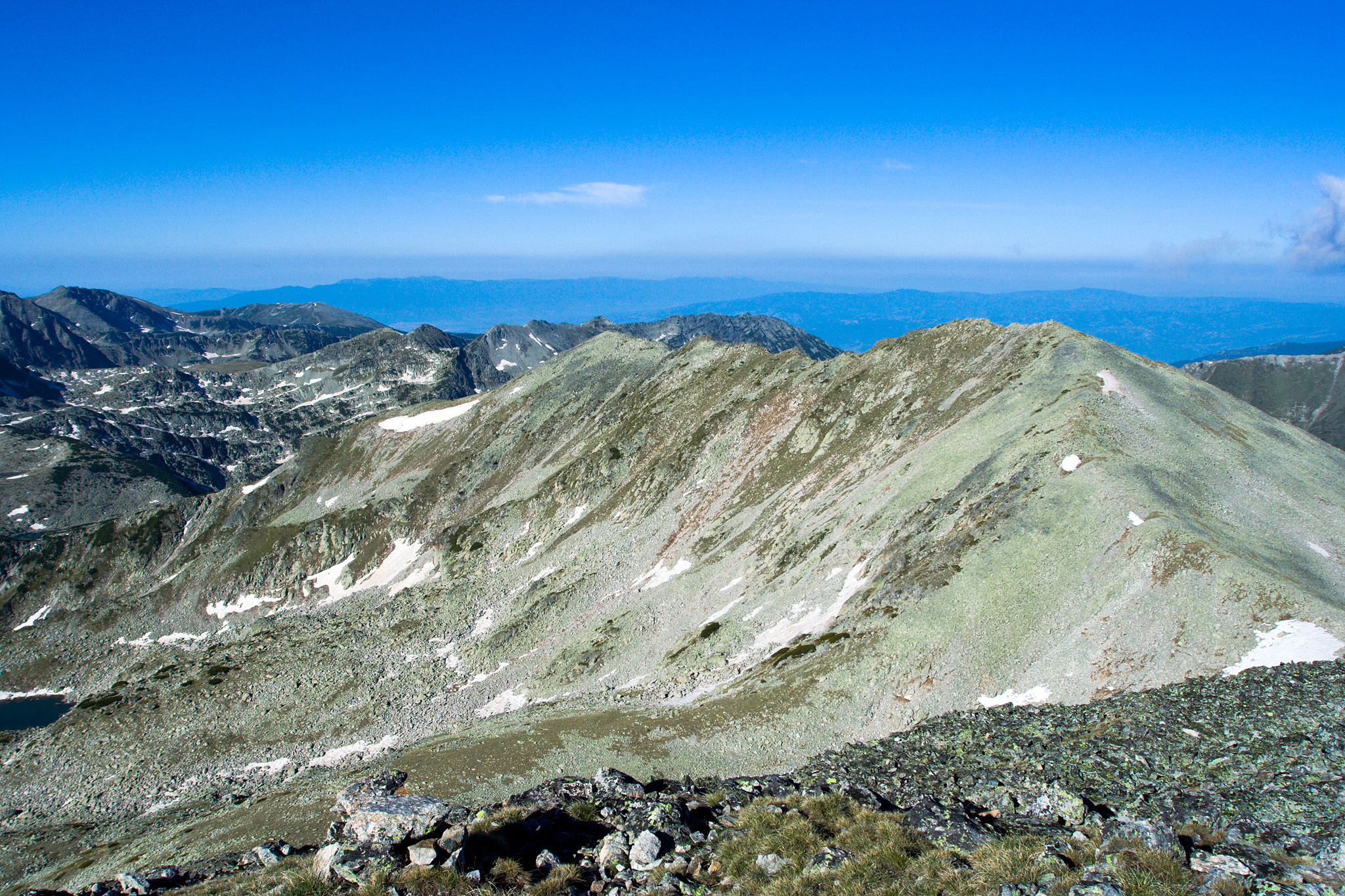
- Malak Polezhan seen from Polezhan

Highest point
- Elevation: 2,822 m (9,259 ft)
- Coordinates: 41°43′23.16″N 23°29′22.92″E

Geography
- Location: Blagoevgrad Province, Bulgaria
- Parent range: Pirin Mountains

Malak Polezhan (Bulgarian: Малък Полежан [ˈmaɫɐk polɛˈʒan], meaning Little Polezhan) is a peak in the northern section of the Pirin mountain range, south-western Bulgaria. Its height is 2,822 m which places it among the top ten summits of Pirin. The peak is built up of granite. Malak Polezhan is situated on the Polezhan side-ward ridge of the range between the peaks of Polezhan (2,851 m) to the north-east and Dzhengal (2,730 m) to the south.

It is linked with Polezhan via a short and shallow saddle. To the east adjacent to the saddle is situated the Upper Polezhan Lake (2,706 m), the highest glacial lake in Pirin and the second one in Bulgaria, although some authors consider its altitude being 2,710 m which would make it the highest in Bulgaria. South of Malak Polezhan in direction of Dzhengal there are several lowers elevations with distinct shape known and the Obidim Ears.

The eastern slopes of Malak Polezhan are very steep, at places vertical, grassy, and with screes of unstable rock material. The north-western slope is a massive scree composed of flagstone typical of the region. Its lowest section reaches the Upper Gazey Lake. To the south-west of the summit there is a small cirque facing the valley of the river Valyavitsa. In western direction there is a short ridge that links Malak Polezhan with the neighbouring summit Gazey (2,761 m).
