= Polezhan =

Peak in Bulgaria

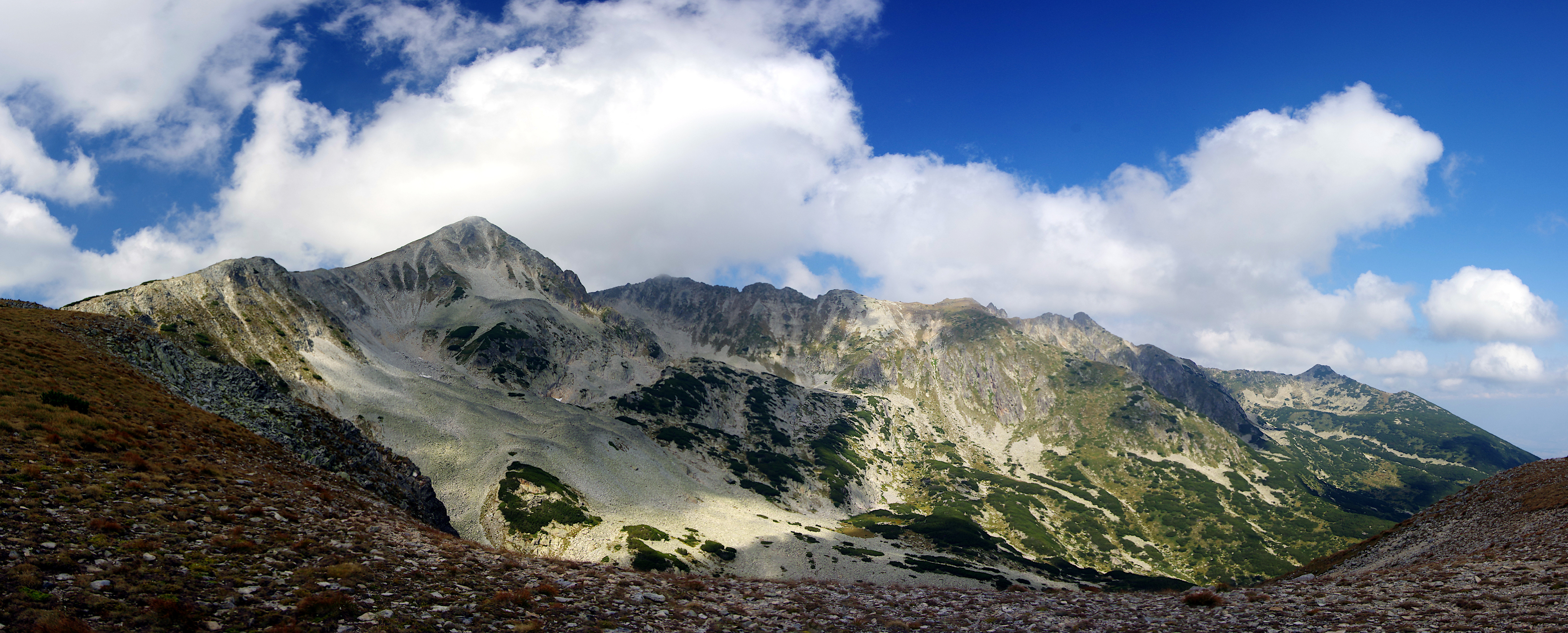
- Polezhan peak as viewed from the saddle next to Bezbog peak.

Highest point
- Elevation: 2,851 m (9,354 ft)
- Coordinates: 41°43′N 23°29′E

Geography
- Location: Blagoevgrad Region, Bulgaria
- Parent range: Pirin

Polezhan (Bulgarian: Полежан [polɛˈʒan], known pre-1942 as Mangar Tepe (Мангър тепе [maŋˈɡɤr tɛˈpɛ]) is a 2,851 m cone shaped high peak in the Pirin mountain range, south-western Bulgaria. It is the highest granite summit in Pirin and the fourth highest in the mountain range after the marble peaks Vihren (2,914 m), Kutelo (2,908 m) and Banski Suhodol (2,884 m).

It is situated on the Polezhan side ridge which also includes the summits of Malak Polezhan (2,822 m), Gazey (2,761 m), Bezbog (2,645 m), Kaymakchal (2,763 m) and Disilitsa (2,700 m), as well as the imposing edge of Strazhite.

The closest mountain refuge is Bezbog named after homonymous peak which lies near Polezhan. Depending on weather conditions the mountain refuge is about 2-3h from Polezhan. Two of the highest lakes in Pirin are situated in the vicinity of Polezhan, namely the Upper Polezhan Lake at 2,706 m, the second highest lake in Bulgaria, as well as the Upper Gazey Lake at 2,642 m.

== Gallery ==
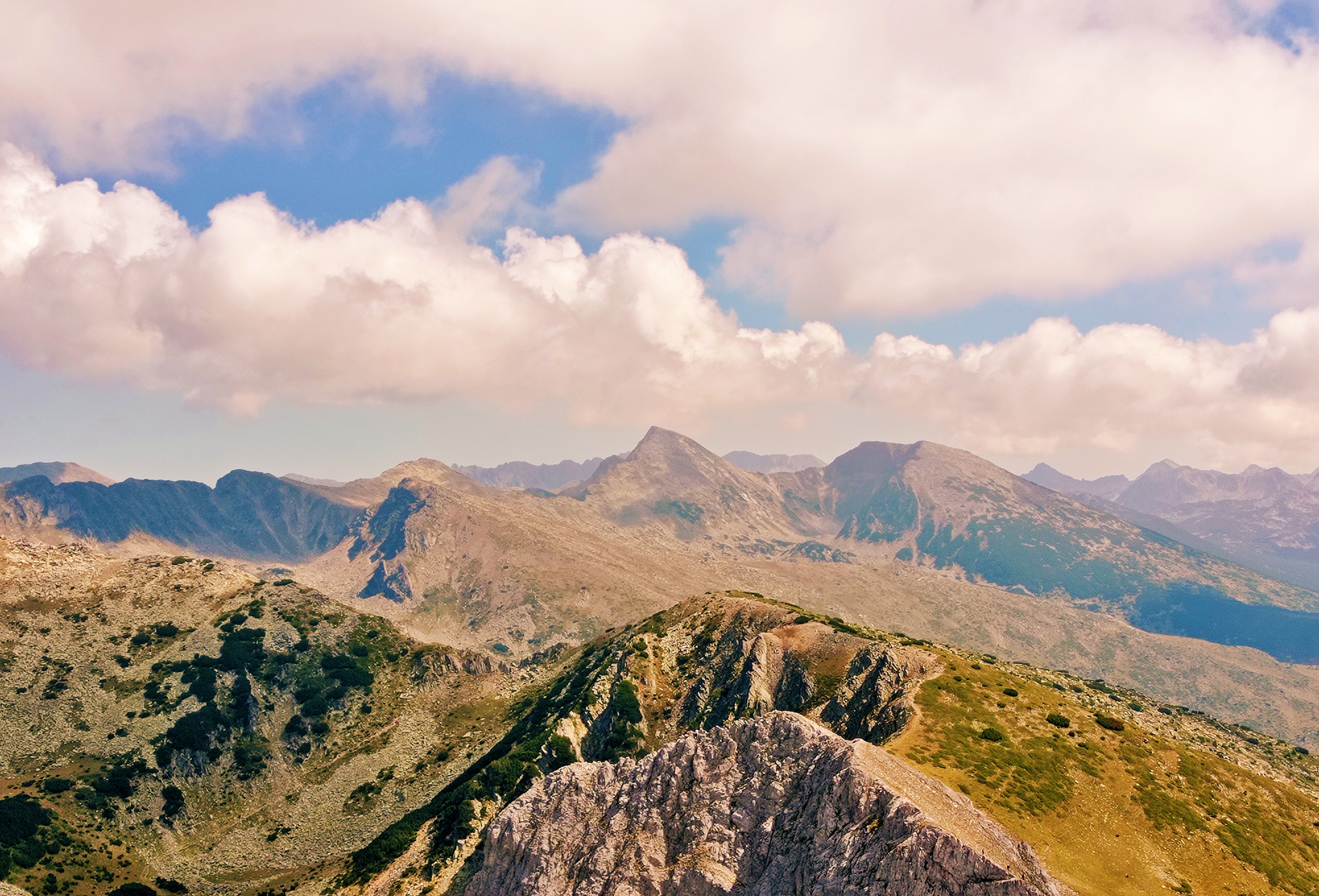

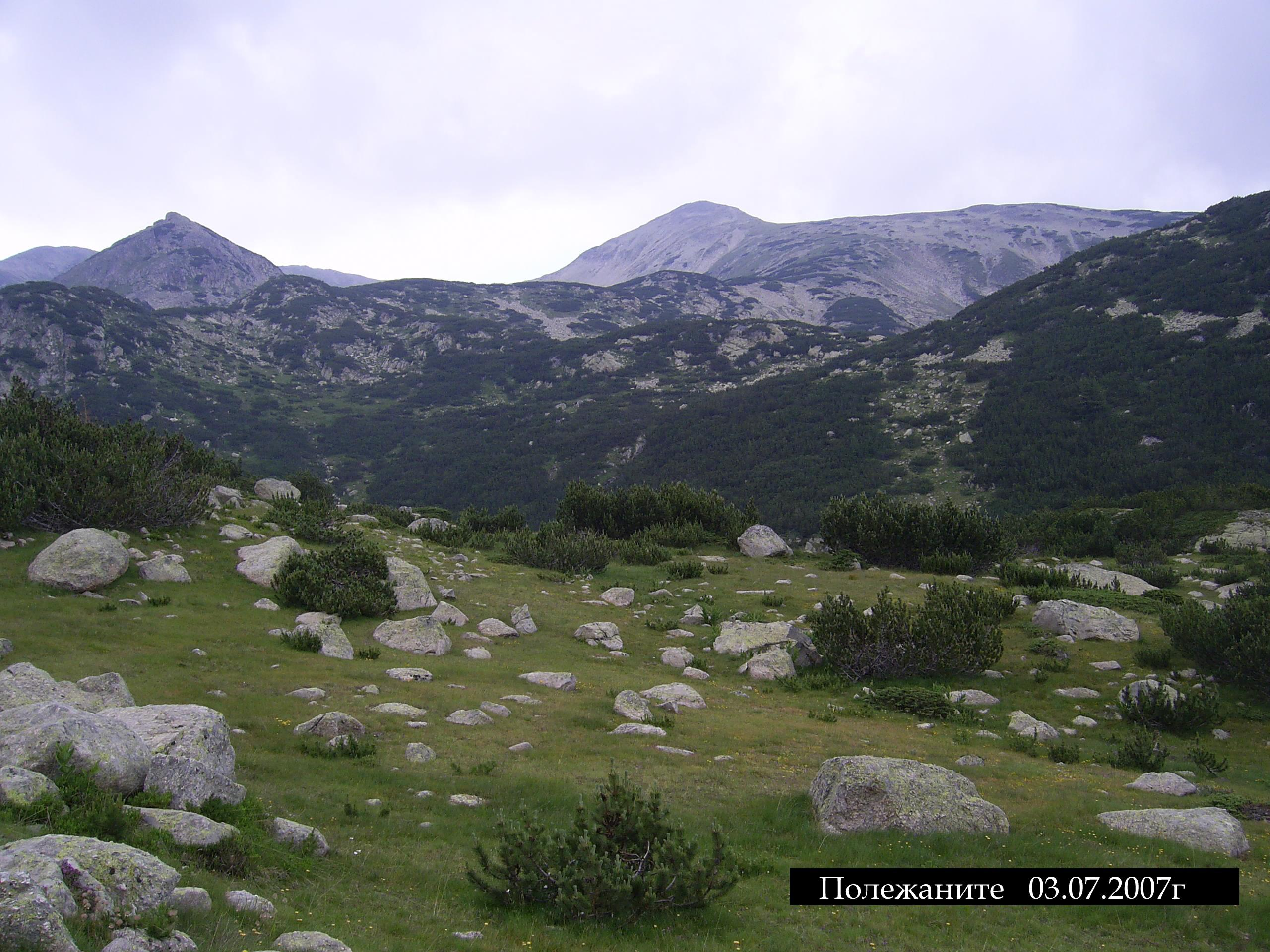

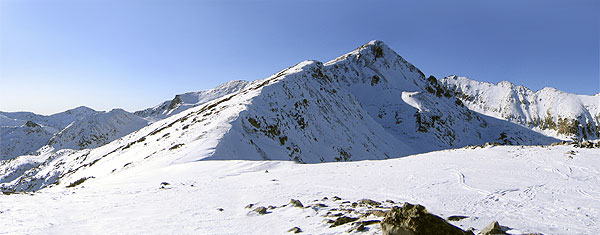
