= Bezbozhko Lake =

Glacial lake in Bulgaria

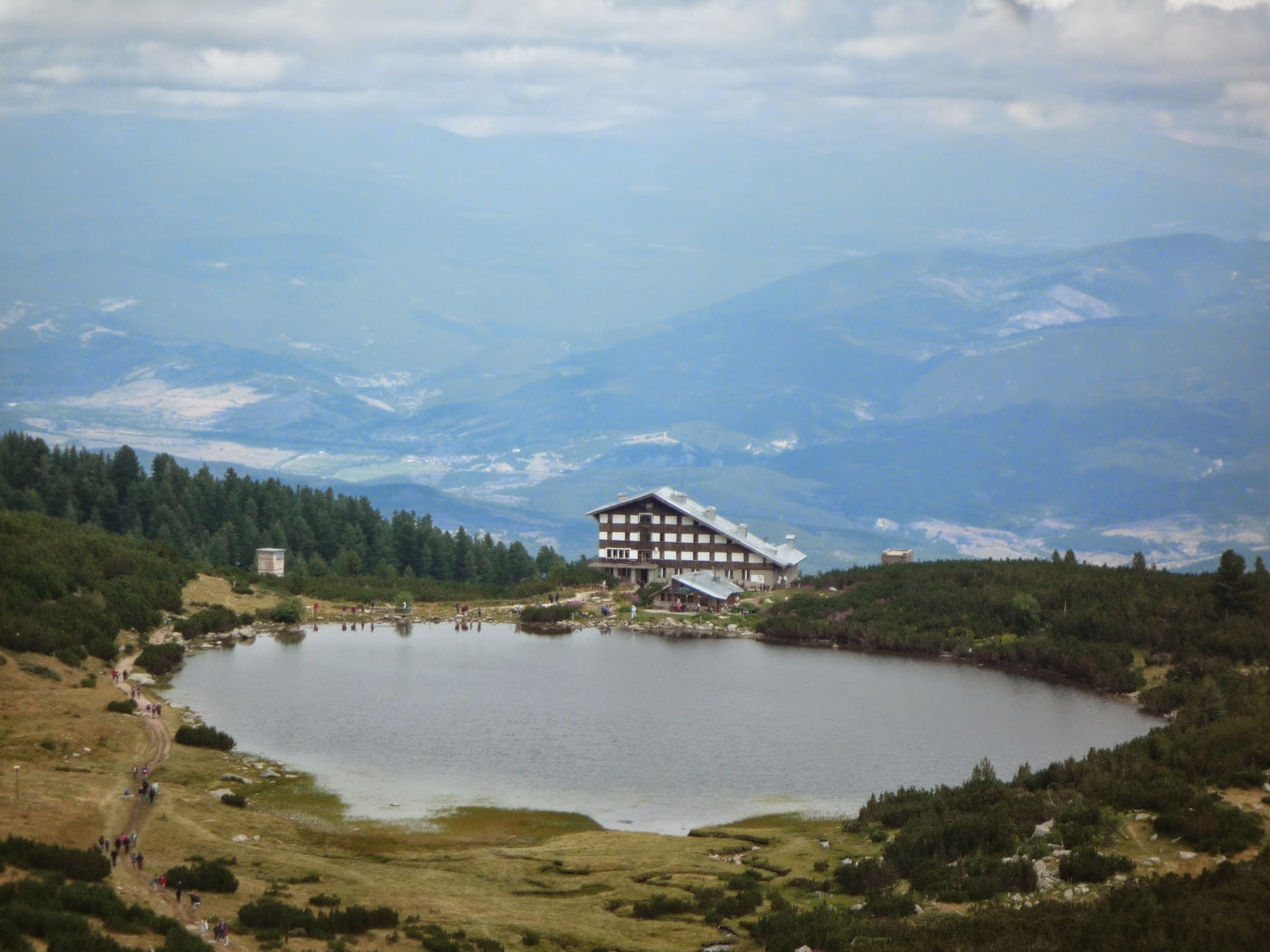

- Location within Bulgaria
- Location: Pirin
- Coordinates: 41°43′59″N 23°31′27″E
- Basin countries: Bulgaria
- Max. length: 225 m (738 ft)
- Max. width: 125 m (410 ft)
- Surface area: 19,000 m^{2} (200,000 sq ft)
- Max. depth: 7 m (23 ft)
- Surface elevation: 2,239 m (7,346 ft)

Bezbozhko Lake (Bulgarian: Безбожко езеро) is a glacial lake in the Pirin mountain range, southwestern Bulgaria. It is located in the Pirin National Park, a UNESCO World Heritage Site.

Bezbozhko Lake is situated at an altitude of 2,239 m in the Bezbozhki cirque at about 1 km to the northeast of the summit of Bezbog (2,645 m) along with three small non-permanent lakes. On its northern shores is located the Bezbog refuge. The surrounding are covered with dwarf mountain pine (Pinus mugo).

The lake is 225 m long and 125 m wide, with a surface area of 19,000 m^{2}. It reaches depth of 7 m. Its waters are with low mineralization. It the source of the 16 km river Bezbozhka reka, a right tributary of the Mesta.

The nearby slopes are sometimes prone to avalanches; in 1971 an avalanche destroyed the first Bezbog refuge on the northwestern shores of the lake.

The main starting point to reach the lake is the town of Dobrinishte in the Razlog Valley. Nearby landmarks include the Kremenski Lakes and Popovo Lake, as well as the summits of Bezbog, Polezhan (2,851 m) and Dzhengal (2,730 m).

== Gallery ==
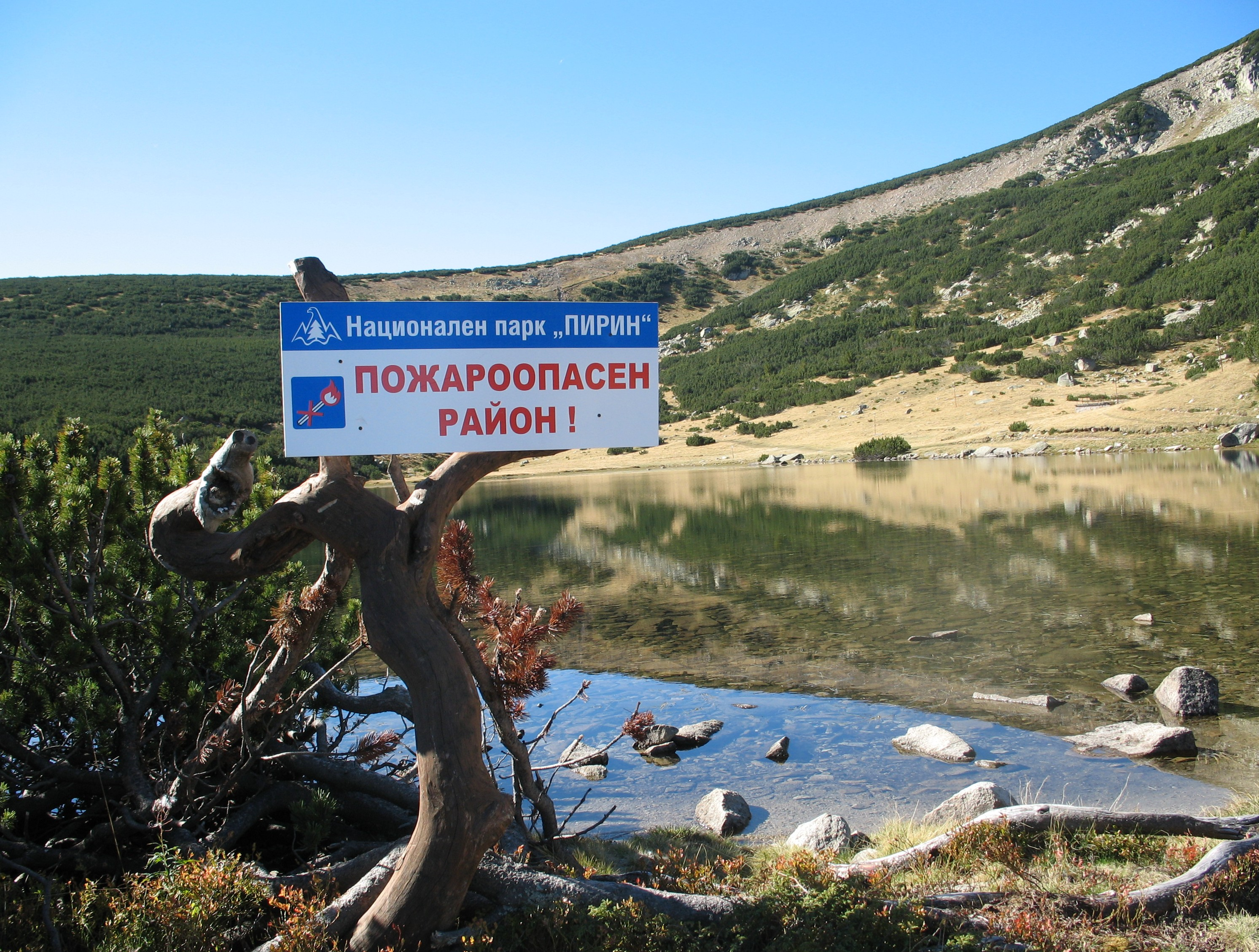

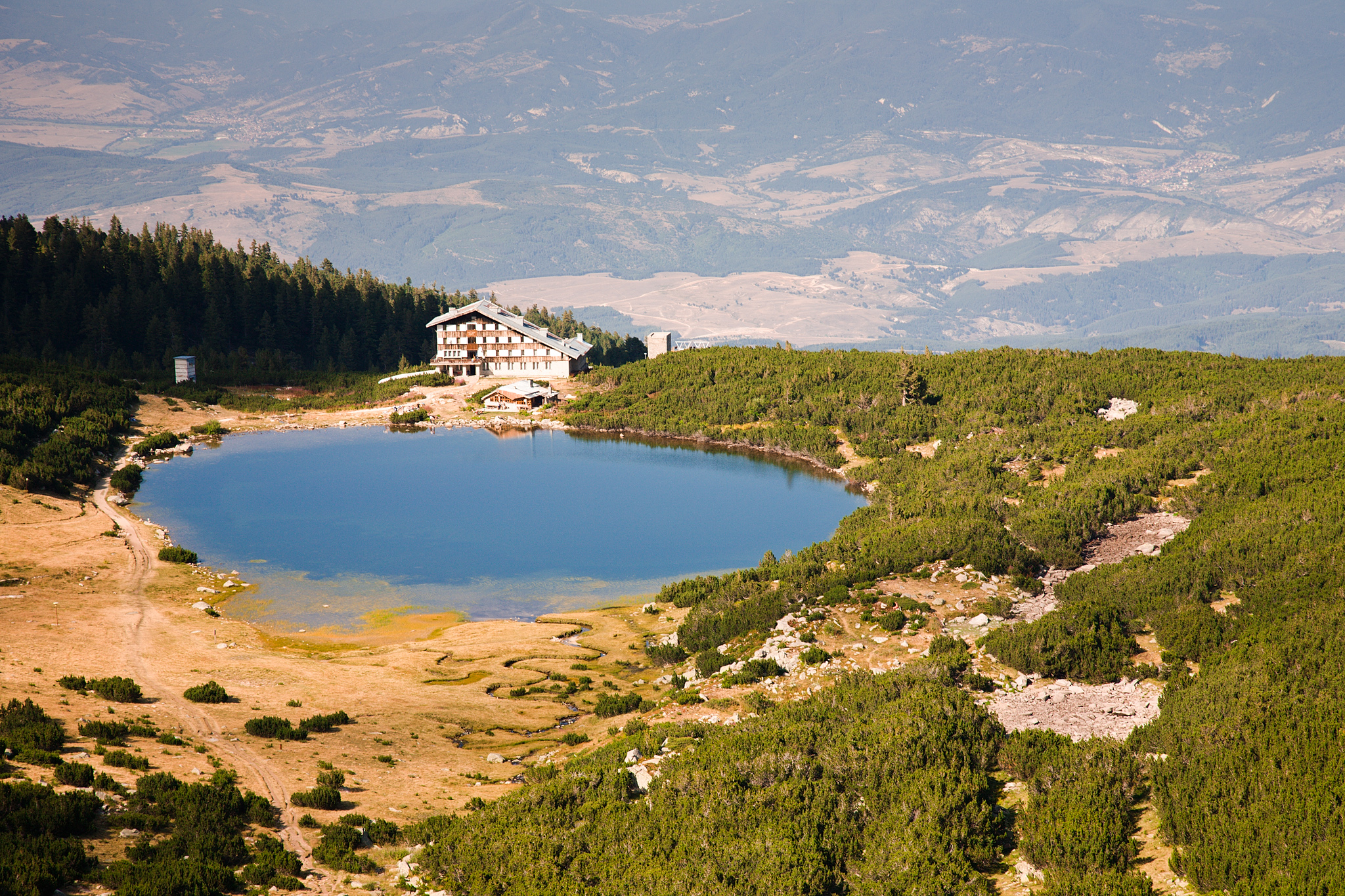

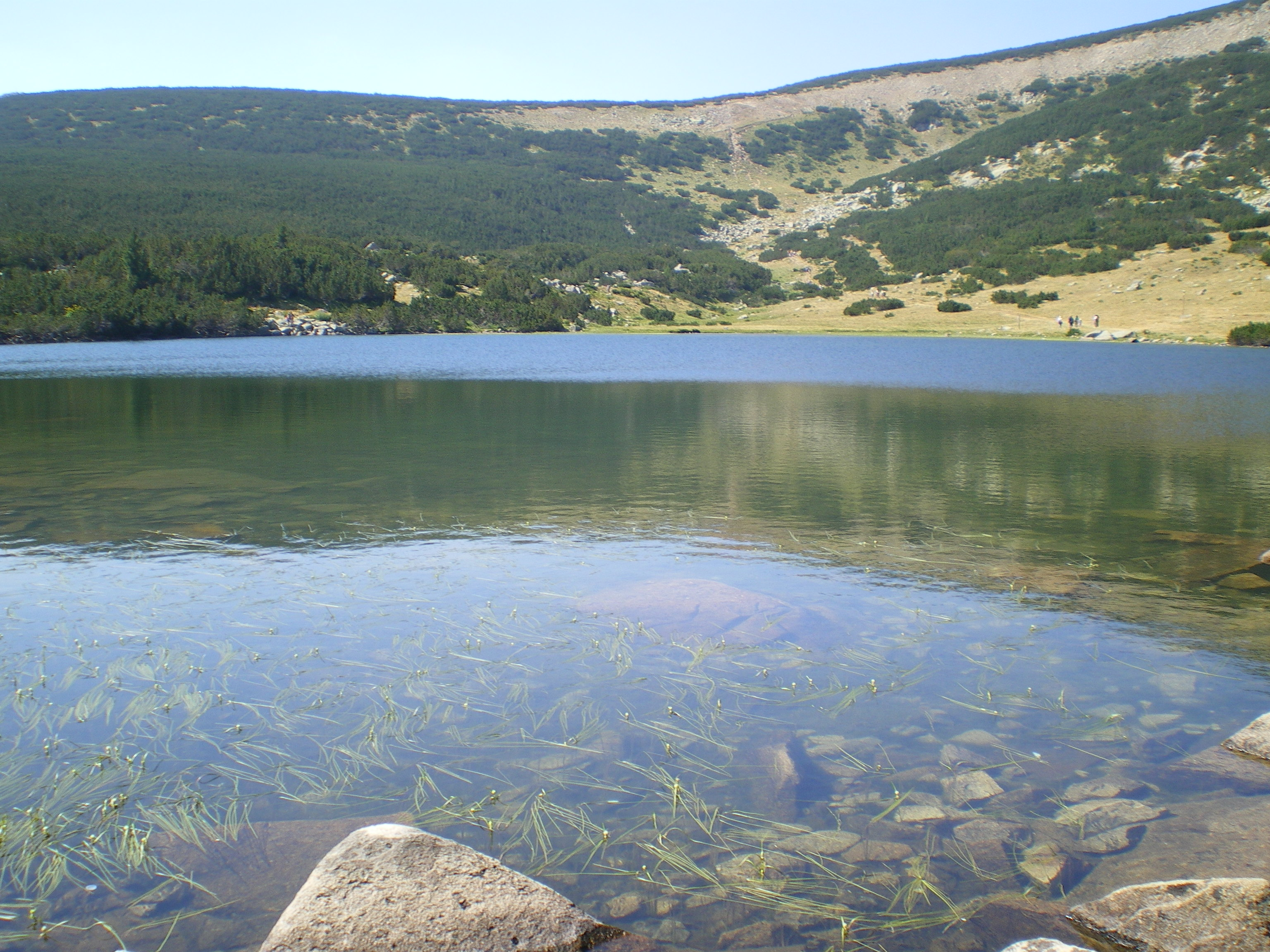

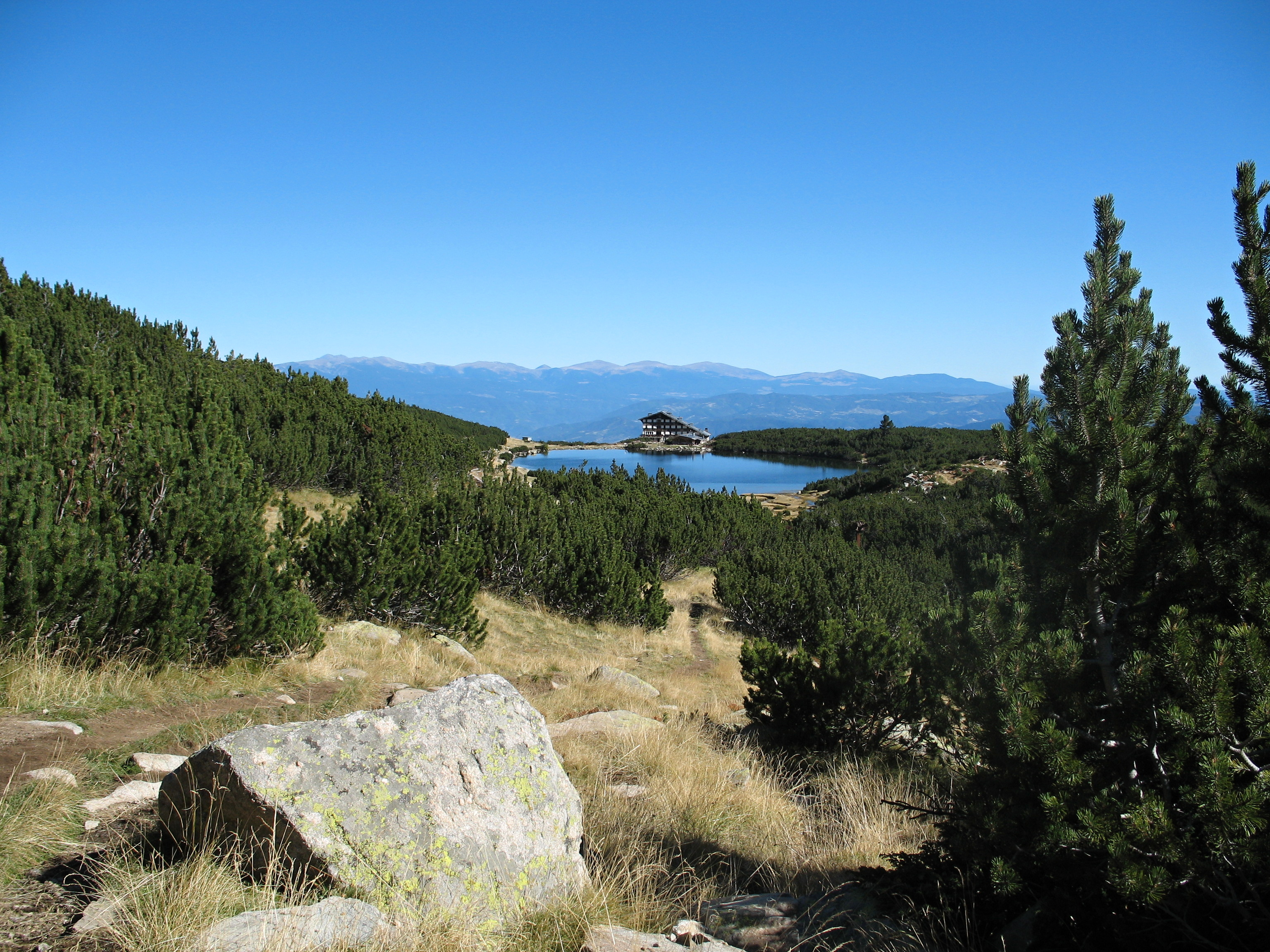
