= Bezbog (mountain) =

Peak in the Pirin range in Bulgaria

Bezbog (Безбог)
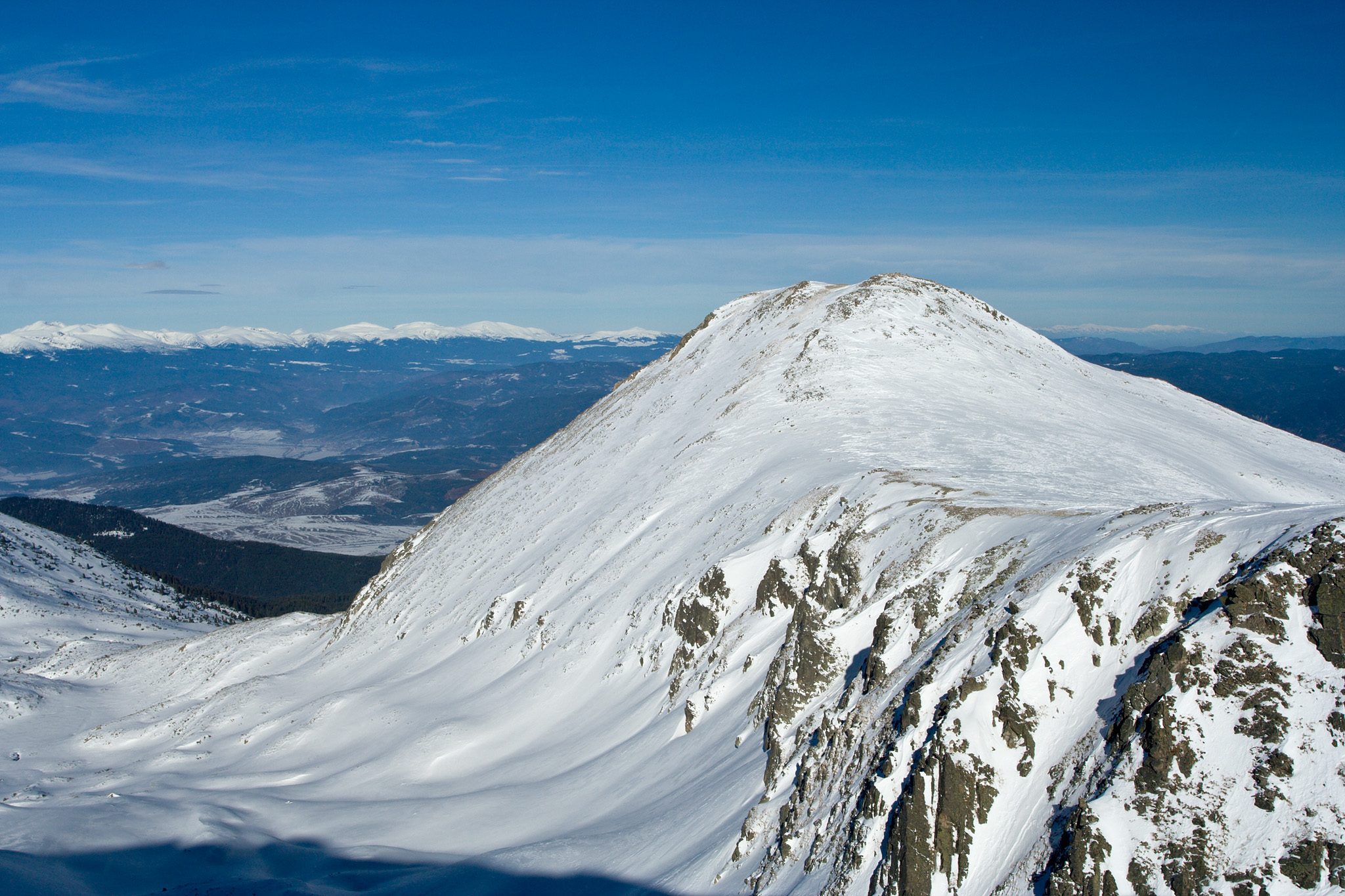

Highest point
- Elevation: 2,645 m (8,678 ft)
- Coordinates: 41°43′53.92″N 23°30′45.93″E

Geography
- Location: Blagoevgrad Province, Bulgaria
- Parent range: Pirin Mountains

Bezbog (Bulgarian: Безбог) is a 2,645 m high granite peak in the Pirin mountain range, south-western Bulgaria. It is situated on the Polezhan secondary ridge on a branch that begins at the summit of Polezhan (2,851 m). The slopes in the direction of Polezhan are stony. To the east is located the Bezbog Cirque covered with dwarf mountain pine that hosts the Bezbozhko Lake where there is a trail leading to the Popovo Lake, the largest glacial lake in Pirin. To the north of Bezbog begins a short ridge with grassy and stony slopes in the higher parts and a thick dwarf mountain pine cover that leads to the summit of Bezbozhka Tumba (2,263 m). The western slopes of Bezbog towards the Polezhan Cirque are rocky and very steep, in some places vertical.

The peak is easily accessible from the Bezbog refuge along a narrow trail. Translated from Bulgarian, the name means "Godless" or "no God's land."
