= Gazey Nunatak =

Nunatak on Alexander Island, Antarctica

Location of Alexander Island in the Antarctic Peninsula region

Satellite image of Alexander Island

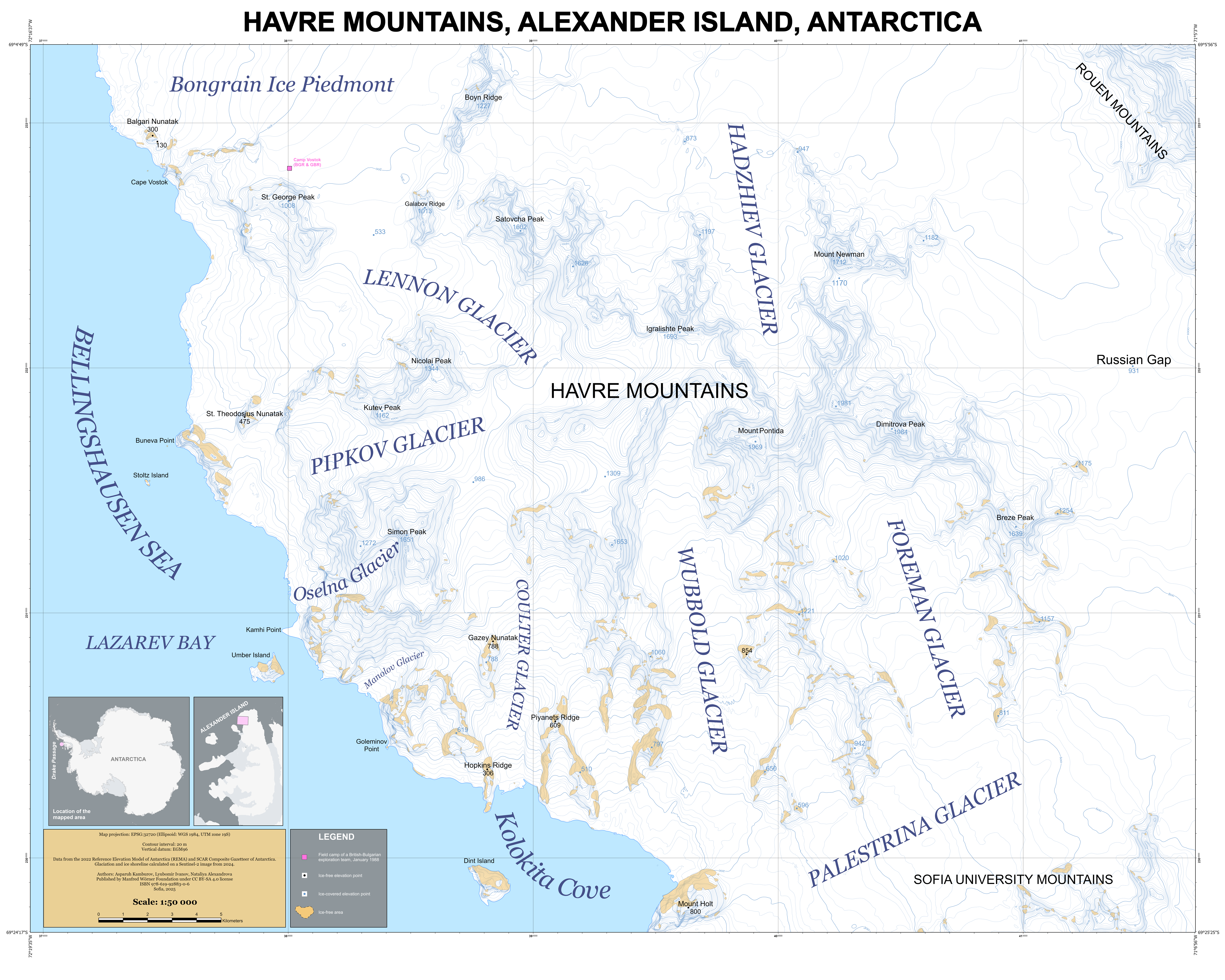
Map of Havre Mountains, Alexander Island in Antarctica

Gazey Nunatak (Bulgarian: нунатак Газей, ‘Nunatak Gazey’ \'nu-na-tak ga-'zey\) is the partly ice-covered ridge extending 2.9 km in north-south direction and 830 m wide, with a central height rising to 770 m and northern one of 776 m in Coulter Glacier, Havre Mountains in northern Alexander Island, Antarctica. The feature is named after Gazey Peak in Pirin Mountains, Bulgaria.

== Location ==
Gazey Nunatak is centred at 69°18′58″S 71°50′28″W, which is 5.26 km northeast of Goleminov Point, 6.15 km south-southeast of Simon Peak, 14.5 km southwest of Mount Pontida and 8 km north of Dint Island.

== Maps ==
- British Antarctic Territory. Scale 1:200000 topographic map. DOS 610 – W 69 70. Tolworth, UK, 1971
- Antarctic Digital Database (ADD). Scale 1:250000 topographic map of Antarctica. Scientific Committee on Antarctic Research (SCAR). Since 1993, regularly upgraded and updated
