= Disilitsa =

Peak in Bulgaria

Disilitsa (Дисилица)
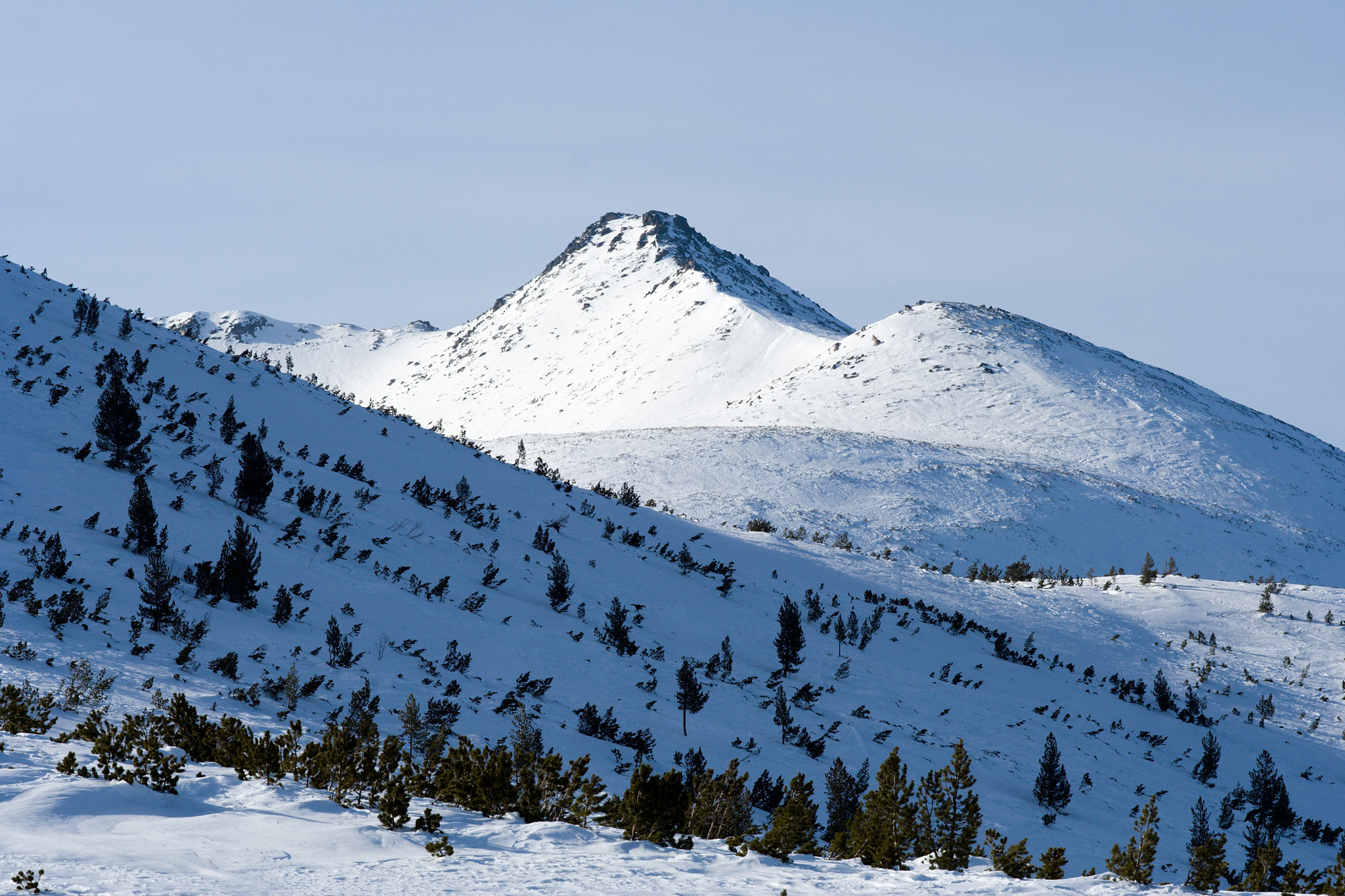

Highest point
- Elevation: 2,700 m (8,900 ft)
- Coordinates: 41°44′50.64″N 23°29′49.2″E

Geography
- Location: Blagoevgrad Province, Bulgaria
- Parent range: Pirin Mountains

Disilitsa (Bulgarian: Дисилица [diˈsilit͡sɐ]) is a 2,700 m high peak in the Pirin mountain range, south-western Bulgaria. It is located on the Polezhan secondary ridge at the end of a stem between Ushitsite and the summit of Kaymakchal (2,753 m) in the south. The slopes of Disilitsa are steep and rocky; they are covered in mountain pine (Pinus mugo) at lower altitude. To the north there is a panoramic view towards the wooded slopes of the Yulen Nature Reserve and the Razlog Valley. To the north-west are located the two Perleshki Lakes and the cirque to the south-east hosts the Pleshivoto Lake, one of the highest in Pirin. The peak is built up of granite.

Although Disilitsa is relatively easily accessible, there are no marked paths passing in its vicinity. Access to the area is controlled by the administration of Pirin National Park, as the summit is situated within the boundaries of the Yulen Nature Reserve.
