= Kaymakchal =

Peak in Bulgaria

Kaymakchal (Каймакчал)
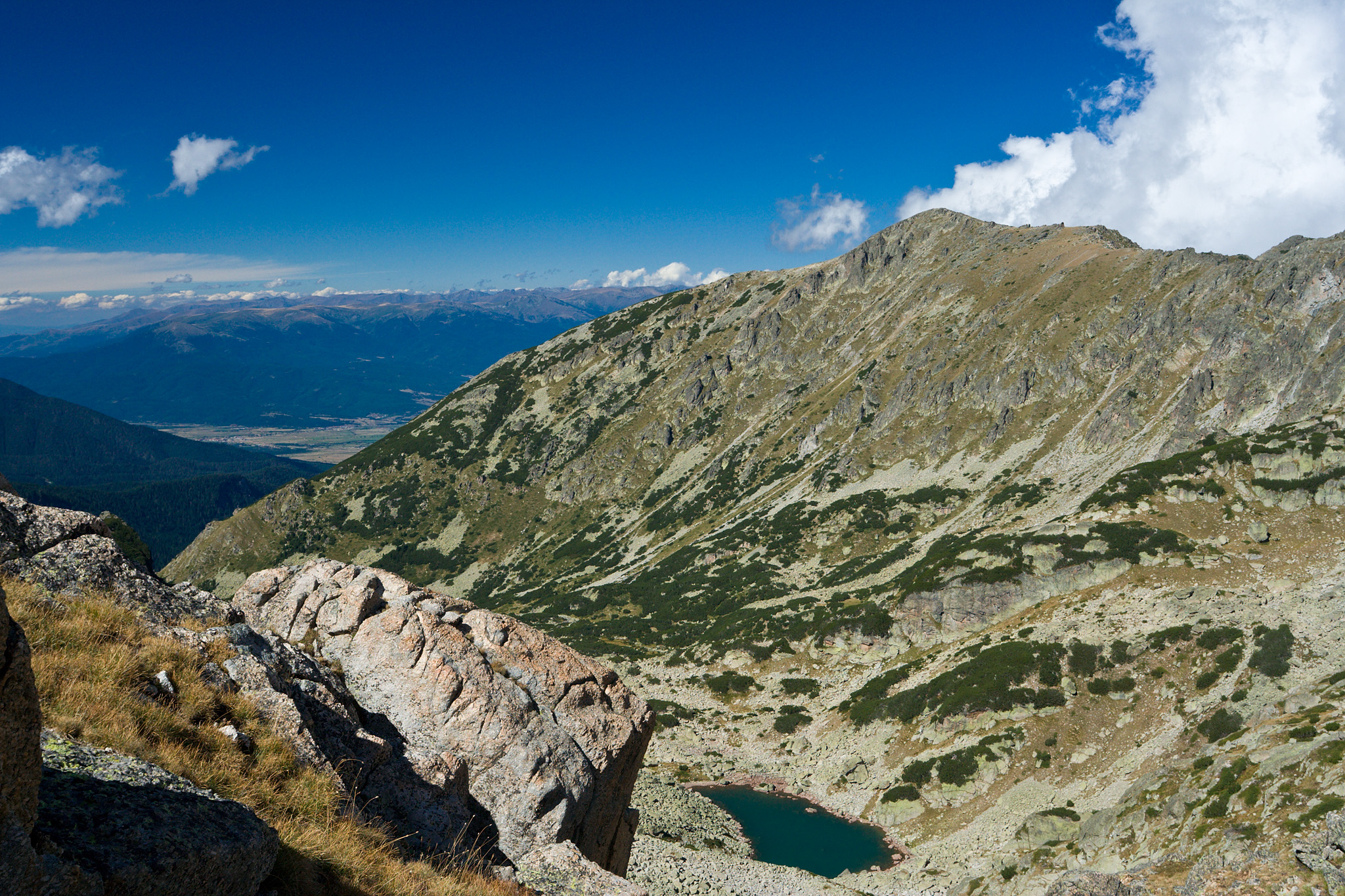
- A view of Kaymakchal

Highest point
- Elevation: 2,753 m (9,032 ft)
- Coordinates: 41°44′44.16″N 23°29′22.56″E

Geography
- Location: Blagoevgrad Province, Bulgaria
- Parent range: Pirin Mountains

Kaymakchal (Bulgarian: Каймакчал), also known as Izvorets (Изворец) is a peak in the Pirin mountain range, south-western Bulgaria. It is located in the northern part of Pirin on the Polezhan secondary ridge. It is 2,753 m high and is built up of granite.

Four cirques meet up at Kaymakchal - the Gazey cirque to the south, the Yulen cirque to the north-west, the Perlesh cirque to the north-east and the Desilish cirque to the east.

To the south-east of Kaimakchal is situated the rocky Ushitsite ridge. A long saddle connects the summit to the first needle from the Ushitsite - the Golyamata Strazha. To the north of Kaymakchal is one of the last peaks on the Polezhan secondary ridge, Konarevo (2,438 m). A short ridge stretches in north-western direction, forming the right bank of the Demyanitsa river, and enclosing the Yulen cirque from the west. To the north-east of Kaimakchal is the stony ridge of Disilitsa, which ends with the eponymous peak and forms the southern and south-eastern slopes of the Perlesh cirque.

Kaimakchal is an easily accessible peak. The summit and its surroundings are located within the protected area of the Yulen Reserve in Pirin National Park. There are no marked paths in the area and access to the top is desirable to be done with permission from the Park Guard. From the summit there are view to the Razlog Valley, the Rila and Rhodope mountain ranges, and the summits of Vihren and Kutelo in Pirin.
