= Gazey =

Peak in the Pirin mountain, Bulgaria

Gazey (Газей)
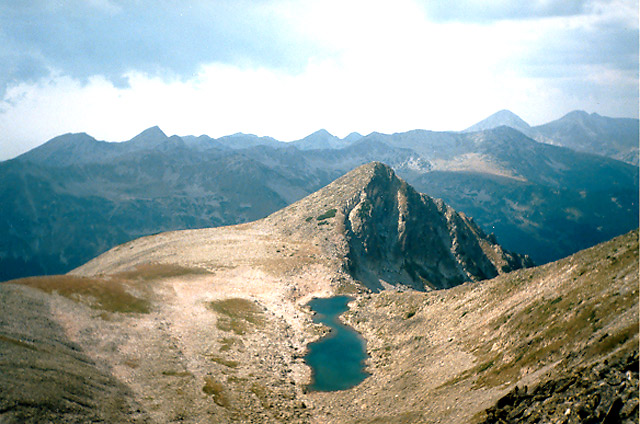
- The Gazey peak looked from Polezhan and the Upper Gazey Lake.

Highest point
- Elevation: 2,761
- Coordinates: 41°43′42.2″N 23°28′58.6″E

Geography
- Location: Blagoevgrad Province, Bulgaria
- Parent range: Pirin Mountains

Gazey (Bulgarian: Газей) is a peak in the Pirin mountain, Bulgaria situated on a small sideward ridge of the Polejansli Ridge. It is 2,761 m high, which makes it ninth in the mountain. Viewed from Polejan it looks small, rising slightly above the Upper Polejan lake but its western slopes are dizzy as they descent towards the valley of Damyanitsa. The peak looks majestic from the valley, and can be clearly seen even from the Razlog Valley. Below the larger peak towers a lower one which also looks imposing. The ridge of the same name forms a cirque in which the two Gazey lakes, some of the highest in the Balkans, are located as well as the Gazey river.

Gazey Nunatak in Antarctica is named after the peak.
