= Polezhanski Lakes =

Glacial lakes in Bulgaria

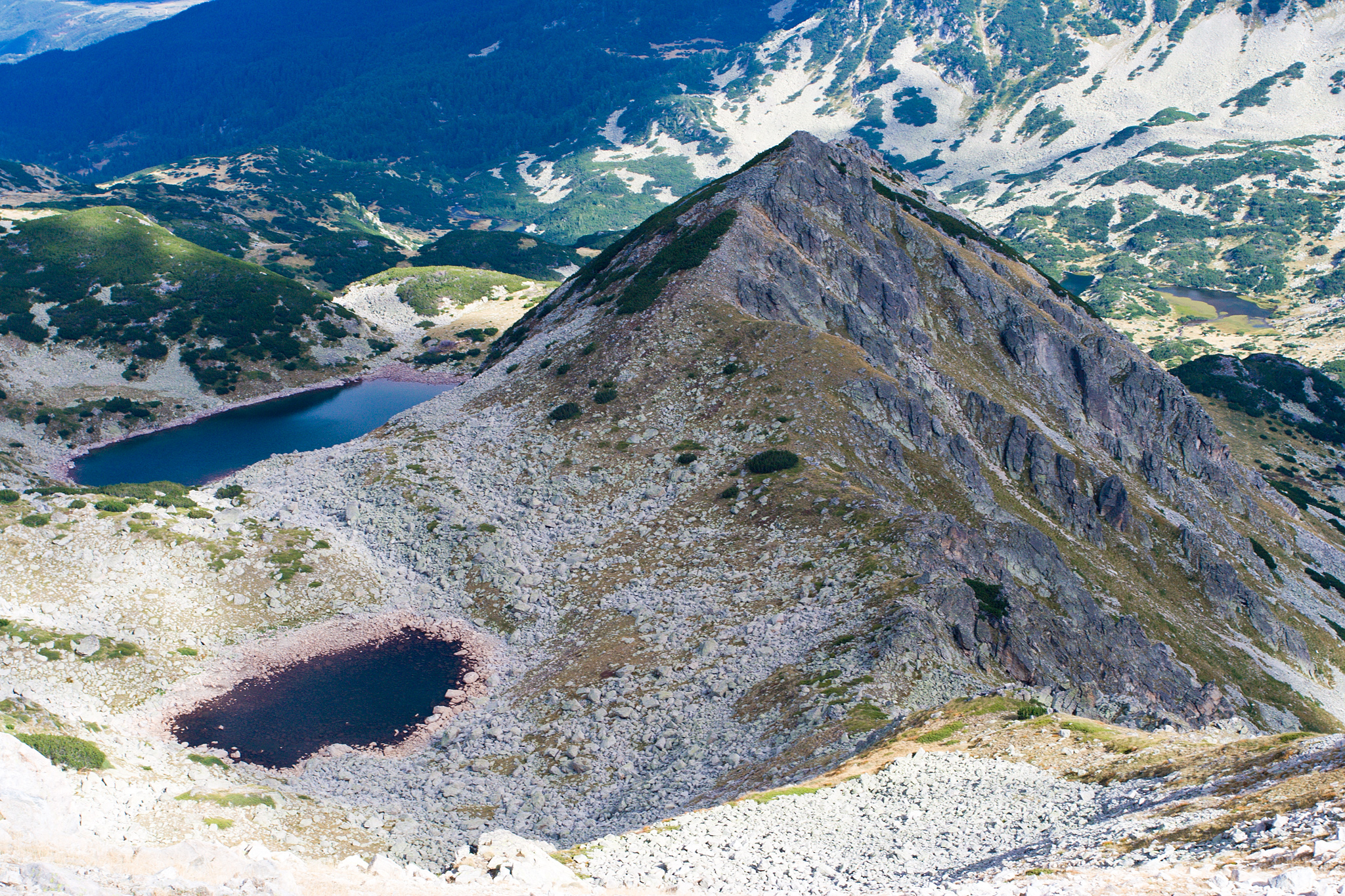

- Location within Bulgaria
- Coordinates: 41°43′26″N 23°29′37″E
- Basin countries: Bulgaria
- Surface elevation: 2,710 m (8,890 ft) to 2,466 m (8,091 ft)

Polezhanski Lakes (Bulgarian: Полежански езера) are a group of two glacial lakes situated in the northern part of the Pirin mountain range in southwestern Bulgaria. They are located in the Southern Polezhan cirque between the summits of Polezhan (2,851 m) to the north and Dzhengal (2,730 m) to the south. They are located in the Pirin National Park, a UNESCO World Heritage Site. The lakes drain into the northwesternmost of the larger Popovi Lakes group, forming the headwaters of the river Retizhe, a right tributary of the Mesta.

The Upper Polezhan Lake is situated at an altitude of 2,710 m at about 200 m southwest of Polezhan. It has elliptical shape, with length of 60 m, width of 50 m and area of 2,200 m^{2}. It is considered by many sources to be the highest lake in Pirin, Bulgaria and the Balkan Peninsula. However, according to the large-scale topographic map of Bulgaria 1:5000 the lake is at 2,705.6 m, making the Icy Lake of the Musala Lakes in the Rila mountain range the highest in Bulgaria and the Balkans.

The Lower Polezhan Lake is at an altitude of 2,466 m at 600 m southeast of the upper lake. It is larger, with elongated shape, length of 160 m, width of 100 m and area of 11,800 m^{2}.

There is also a small non-permanent lake between the upper and the lower lake at an altitude of 2,650 m, which dries out in summer.

== Gallery ==
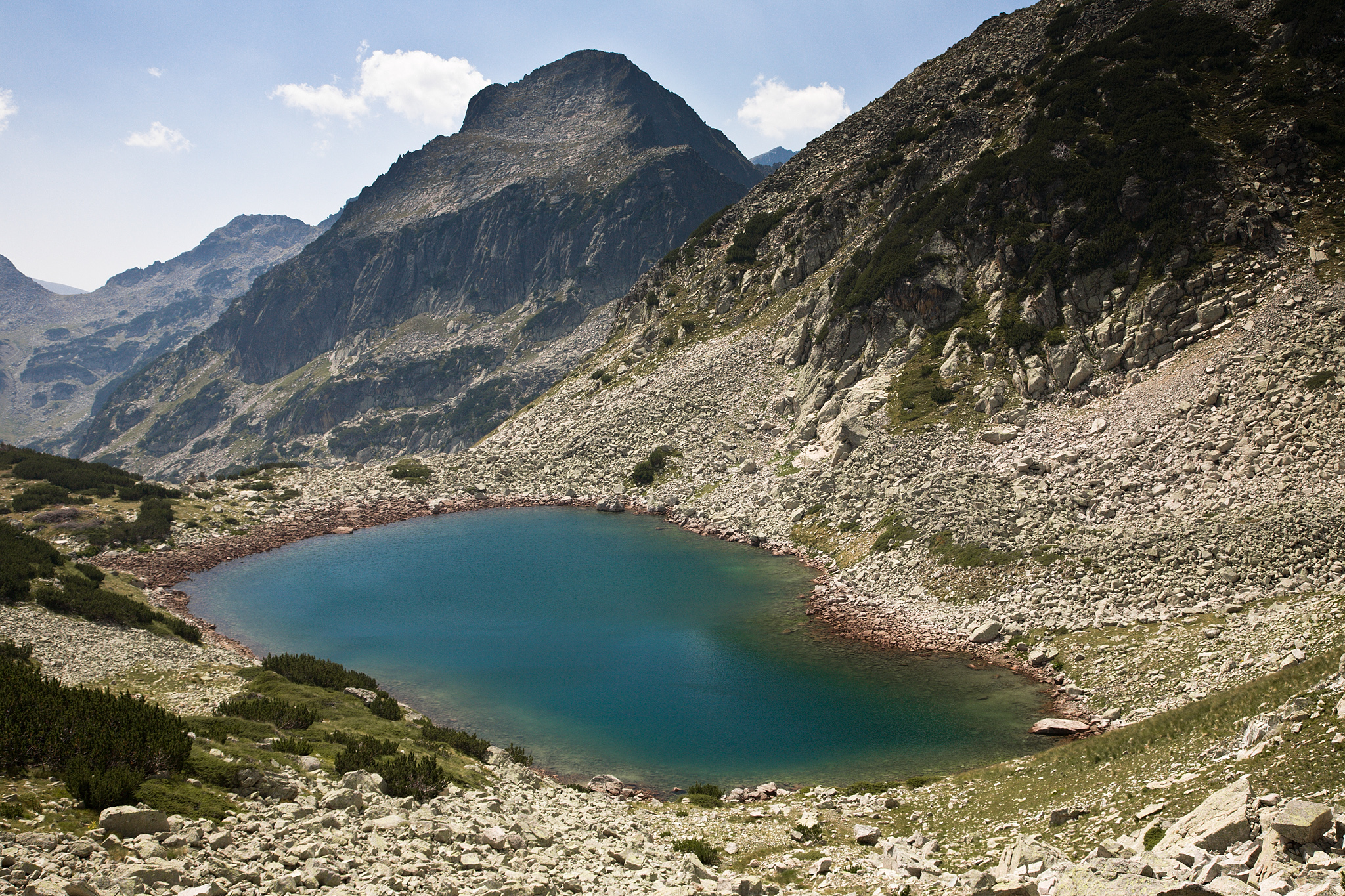

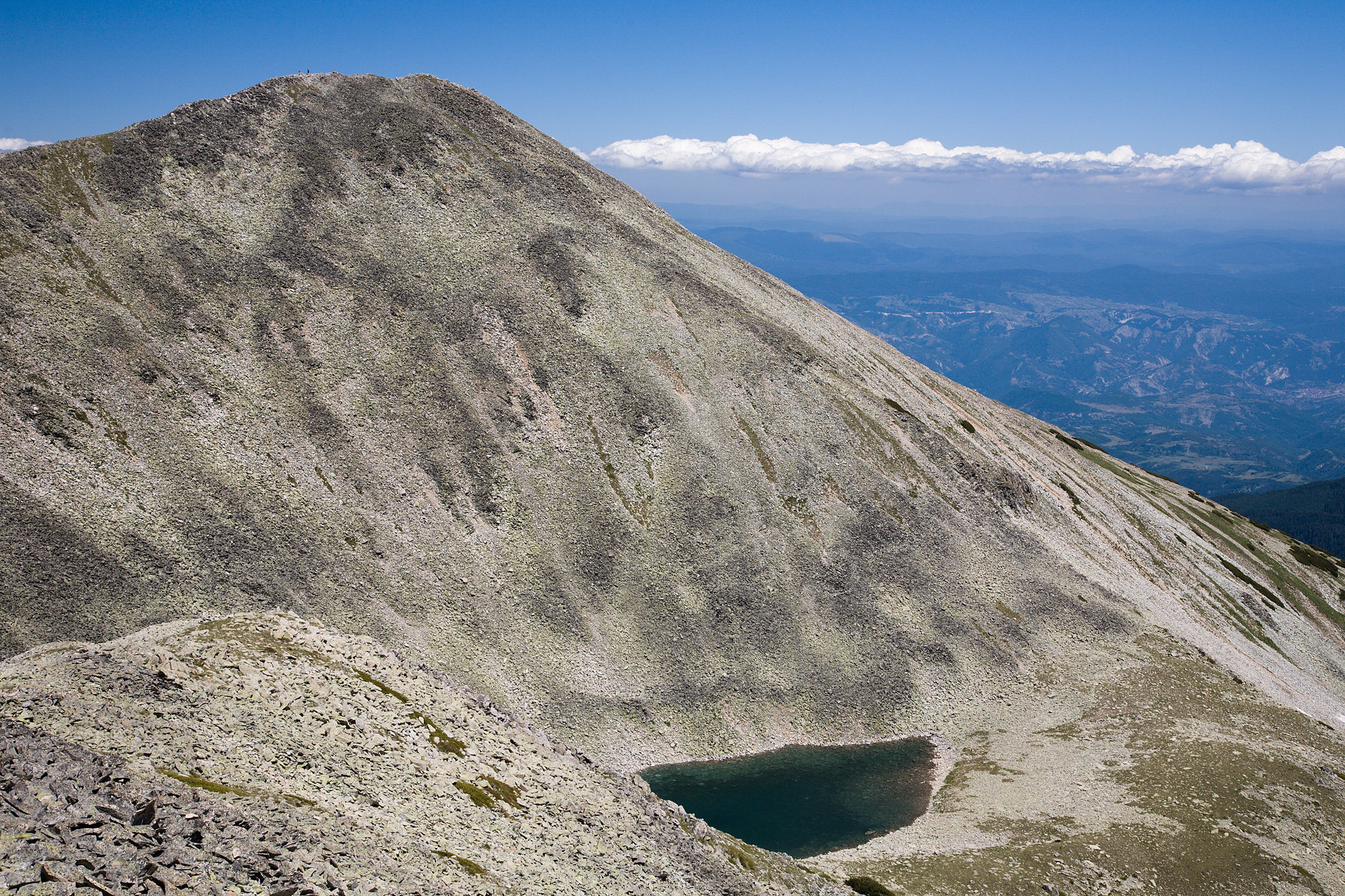

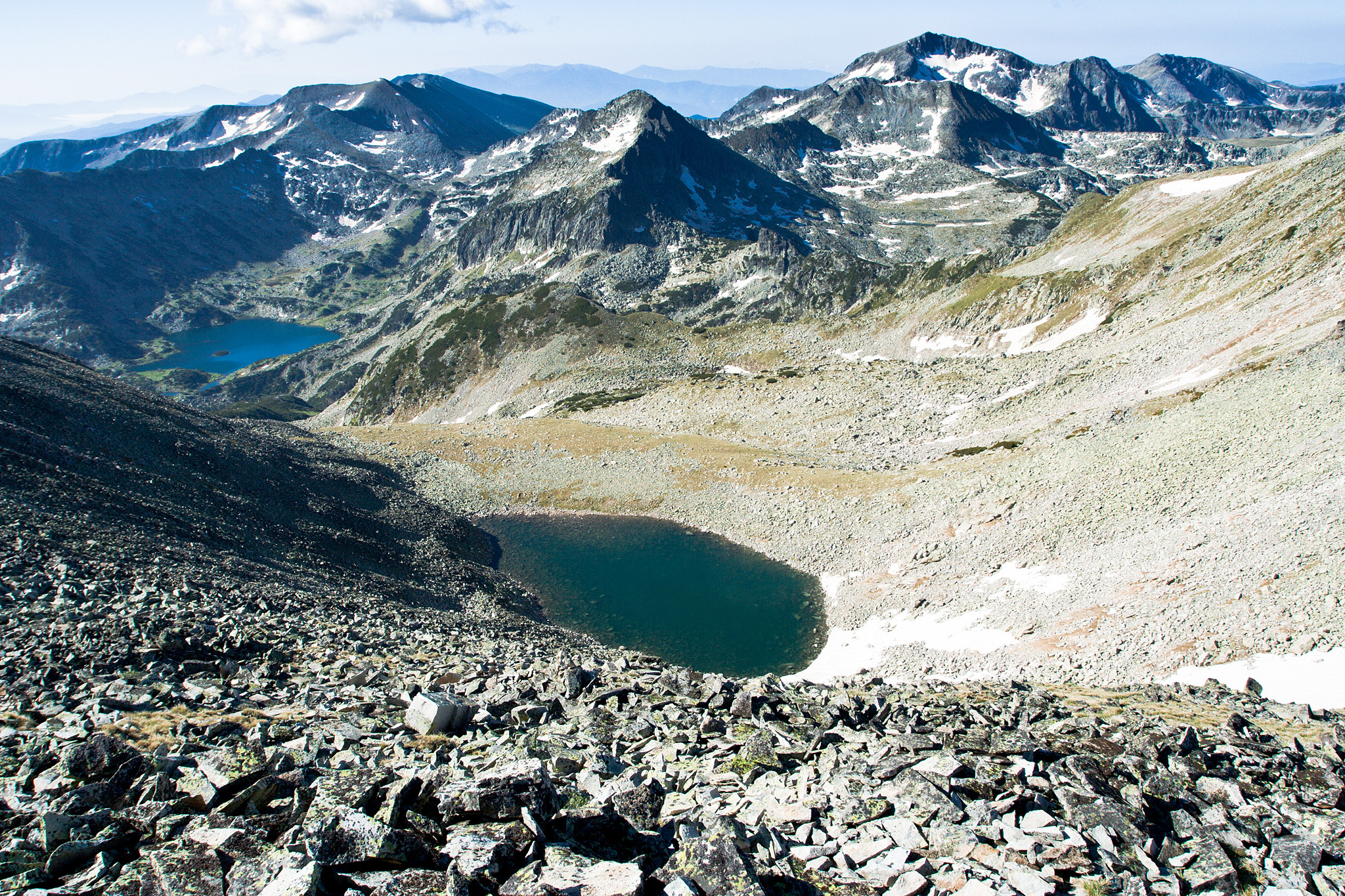

== See also ==
- Lakes in Bulgaria
