= Bashliyski Lakes =

Glacial lakes in Bulgaria

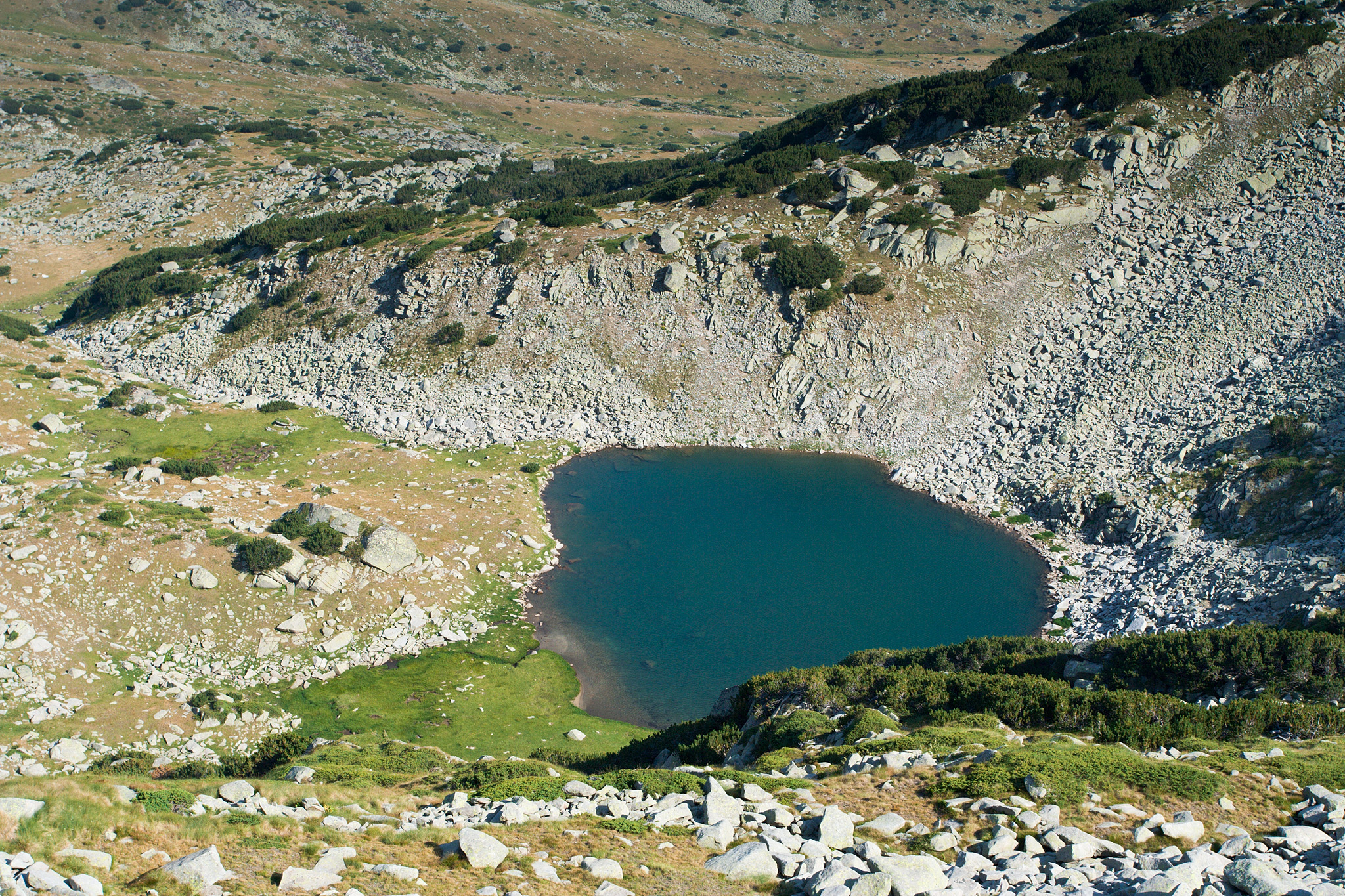

- Location within Bulgaria
- Coordinates: 41°43′24″N 23°25′40″E
- Basin countries: Bulgaria
- Surface elevation: 2,291 m (7,516 ft) to 2,461 m (8,074 ft)

Bashliyski Lakes (Bulgarian: Башлийски езера) are a small group of four glacial lakes situated in the northern part of the Pirin mountain range in southwestern Bulgaria. They are located in the Bashliyski cirque between the summits of Bashliyski Chukar (2,683 m), Banderishki Chukar (2,737 m), Prevalski Chukar (2,605 m) and Tipitsite (2,645 m). They are located in the Pirin National Park, a UNESCO World Heritage Site. The lakes are poorly researched. Their depth is not accurately measured and is estimated at 2–3 m. They are the source of the river Bashliytsa, the uppermost tributary of the Sandanska Bistritsa of the Struma river basin.

== Lakes ==
The uppermost lake, at an altitude of 2,461 m, is situated about 1 km southeast of Tipitsite. The lake is among the ten highest in Pirin. It has a length of 125 m, width of 75 m and area of 5,300 m^{2}.

The second lake, at an altitude of 2,430 m, is 600 m southeast of Bashliyski Chukar. It has a circular shape, length of 80 m, width of 75 m and area of 5,000 m^{2}.

The third lake, at an altitude of 2,313 m, is 1.2 km south-southwest of Tipits and is not connected with the other lakes. It has a length of 50 m, width of 40 m and area of 1,300 m^{2}.

The fourth lake, at an altitude of 2,291 m and situated to the east-southeast of Bashliyski Chukar, is the largest in the group. It has an elongated shape, length of 160 m, width of 100 m and area of 7,800 m^{2}.

== Gallery ==
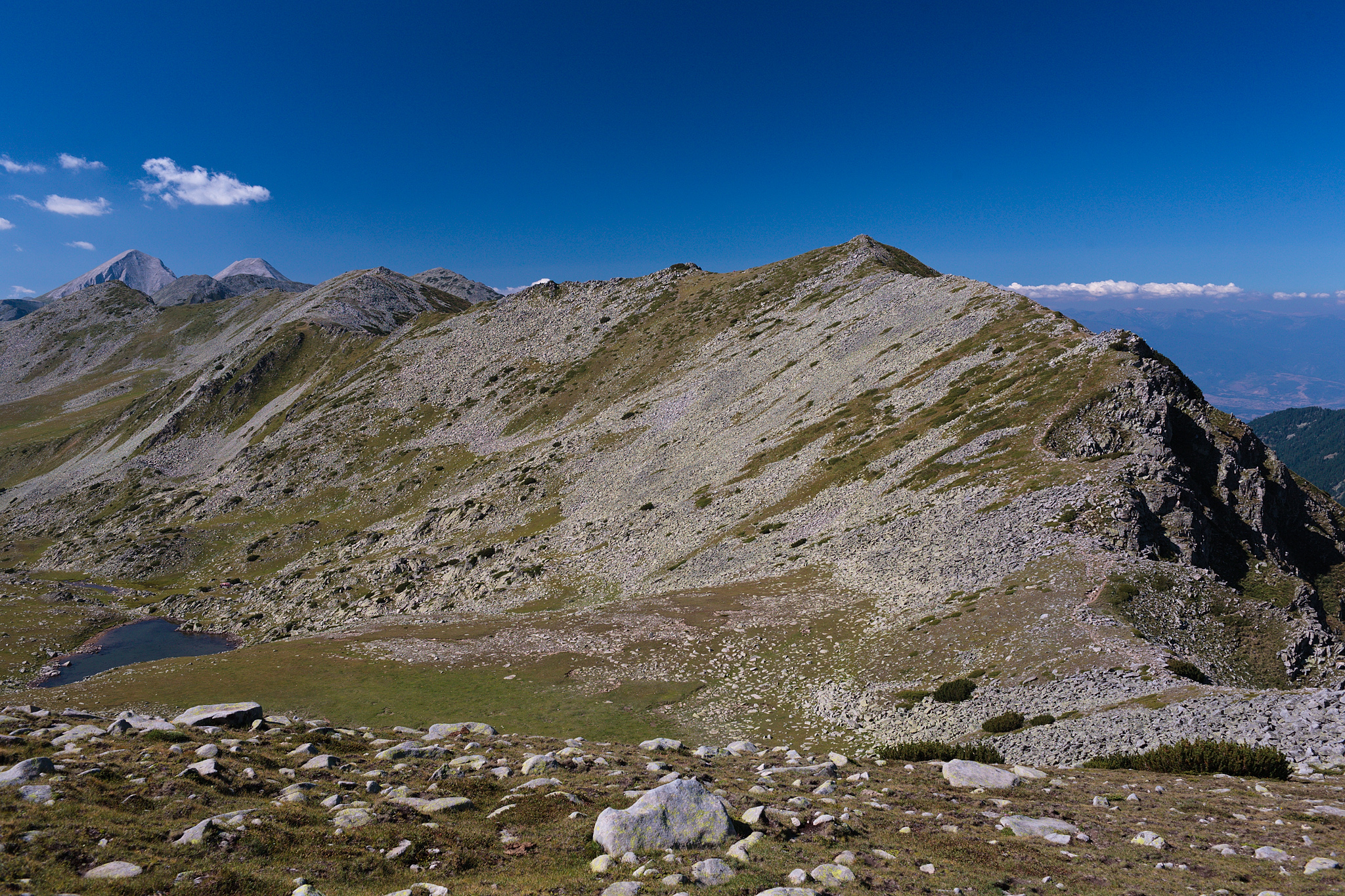

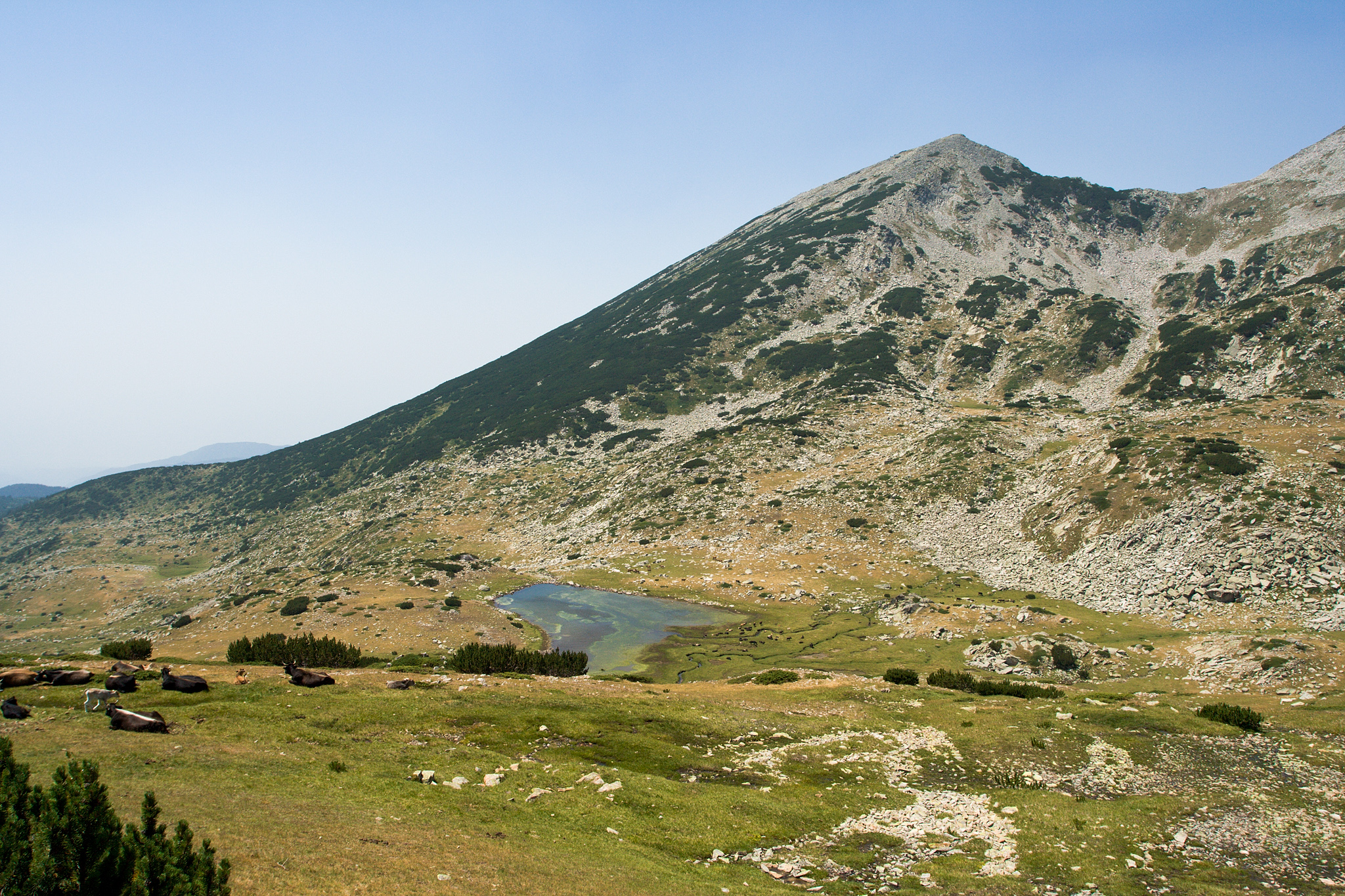

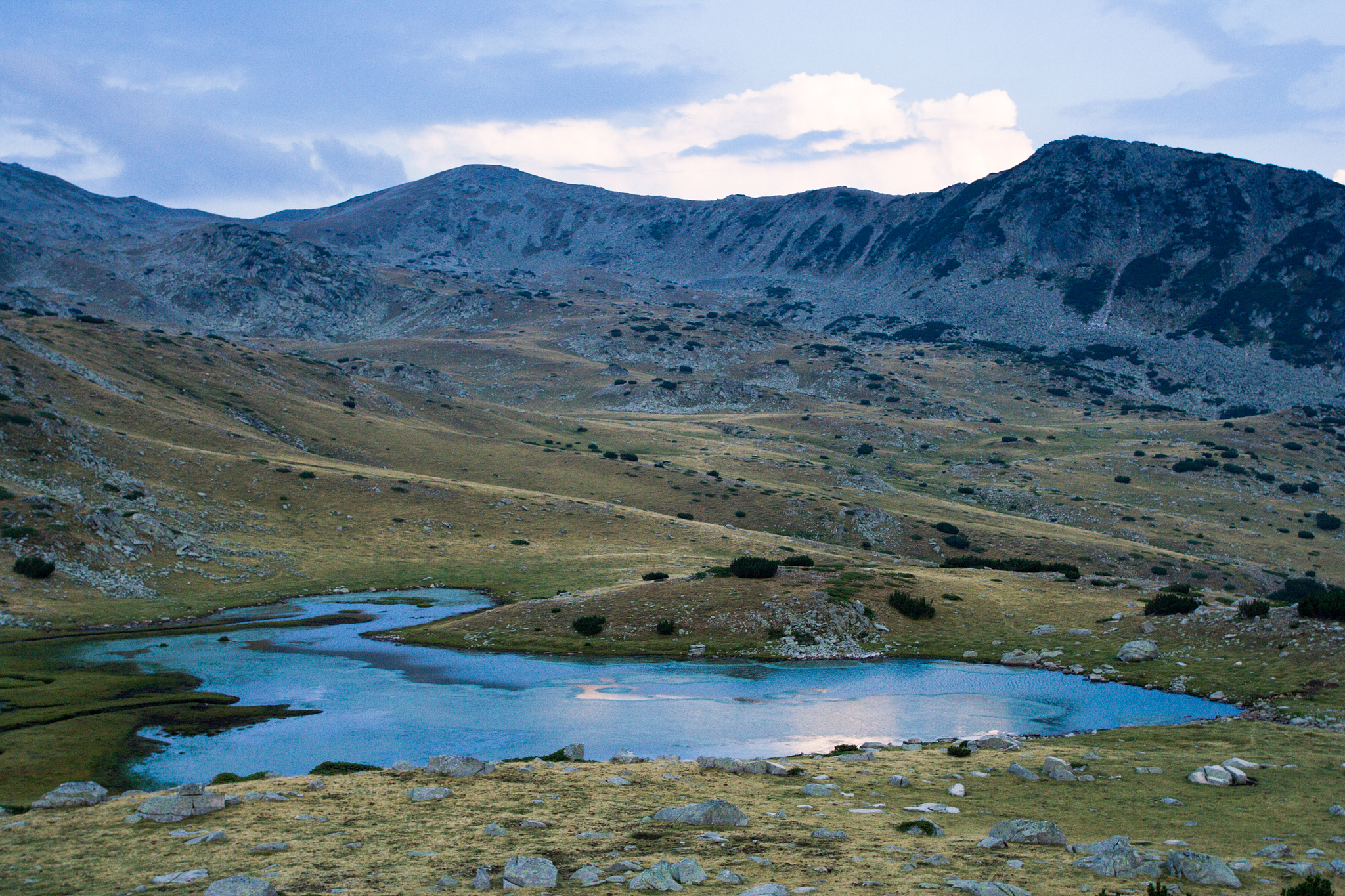
