= Bashliyski Chukar =

Peak in Bulgaria

Bashliyski Chukar (Башлийски чукар)
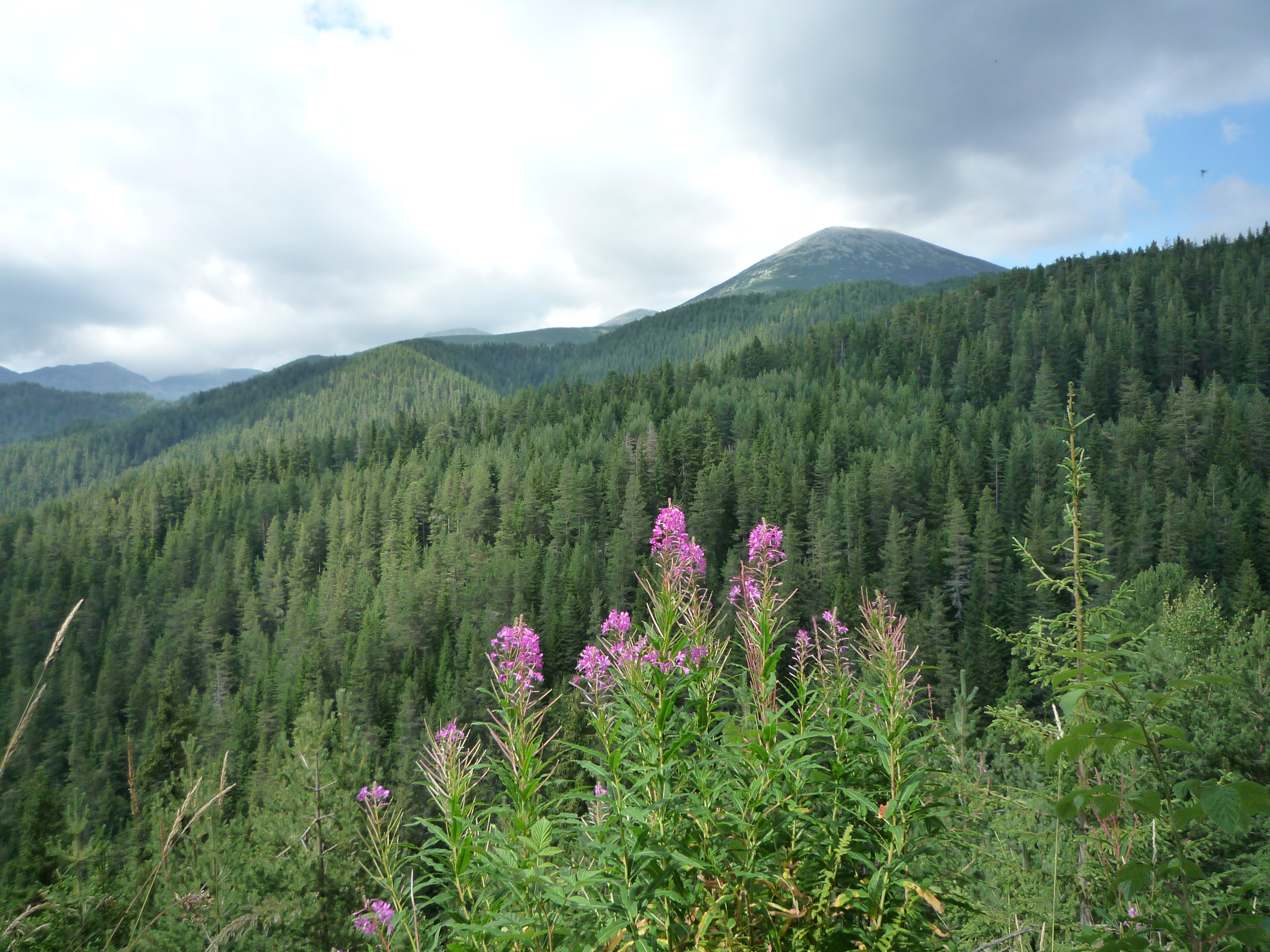
- Bashliyski Chukar seen from a distance

Highest point
- Elevation: 2,683 m (8,802 ft)
- Coordinates: 41°43′16.68″N 23°25′25.32″E

Geography
- Location: Blagoevgrad Province, Bulgaria
- Parent range: Pirin Mountains

Bashliyski Chukar (Bulgarian: Башлийски чукар) is a 2,683 m-high peak in the Pirin mountain range, south-western Bulgaria. It is located in the northern part of Pirin and is built up of granite. It is situated on a short ridge stemming from Banderishki Chukar peak (2,732 m) in south-western direction, separating the Malko Spano Pole and Bashliyski cirques.

The western slopes of Bashliyski Chukar form a hoof-shaped vertical wall reaching a height of 200 m. To the east the slopes are oblique, rocky at higher altitudes and overgrown with dwarf mountain pine (Pinus mugo) in the lower sections. To the south the summit descends slowly to the Atmegdan denudation. The northern slope descends to a short saddle leading to the neighbouring Banderishki Chukar peak. The saddle has steep western slopes and is much more oblique on the eastern ones.

Seen from the main mountain ridge to the east, Bashliyski Chukar and Banderishki Chukar peaks have a distinct appearance. Together, they form a sharp and steep secondary cirque open to the east. At its base are located the Bashliyski Lakes.

Bashliyski Chukar is easily accessible via the Bashliyski Lakes to the north-east and the saddle to the north. The starting point for ascending the peak are the Yane Sandanski and Begovitsa refuges.

== Gallery ==
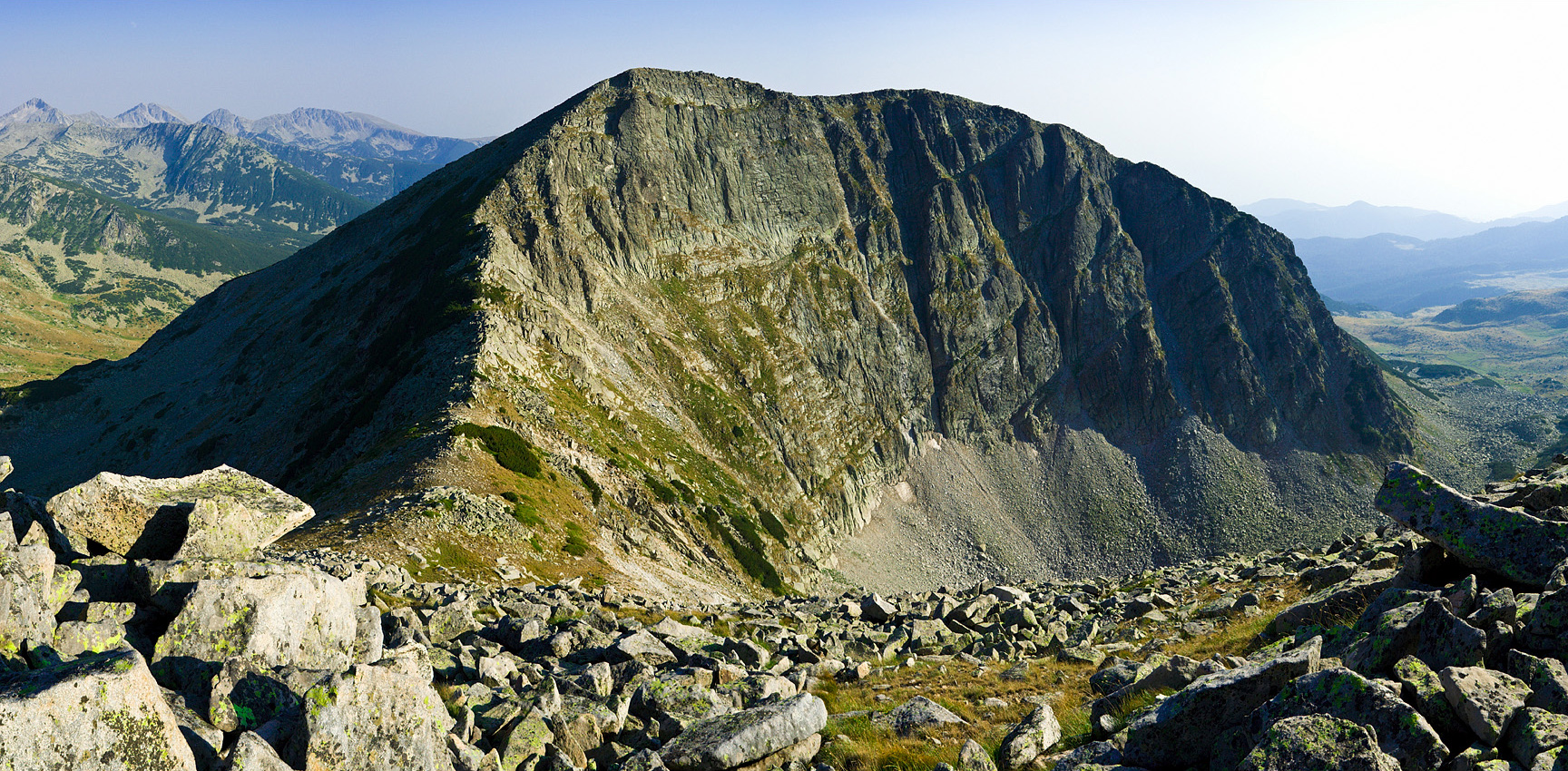

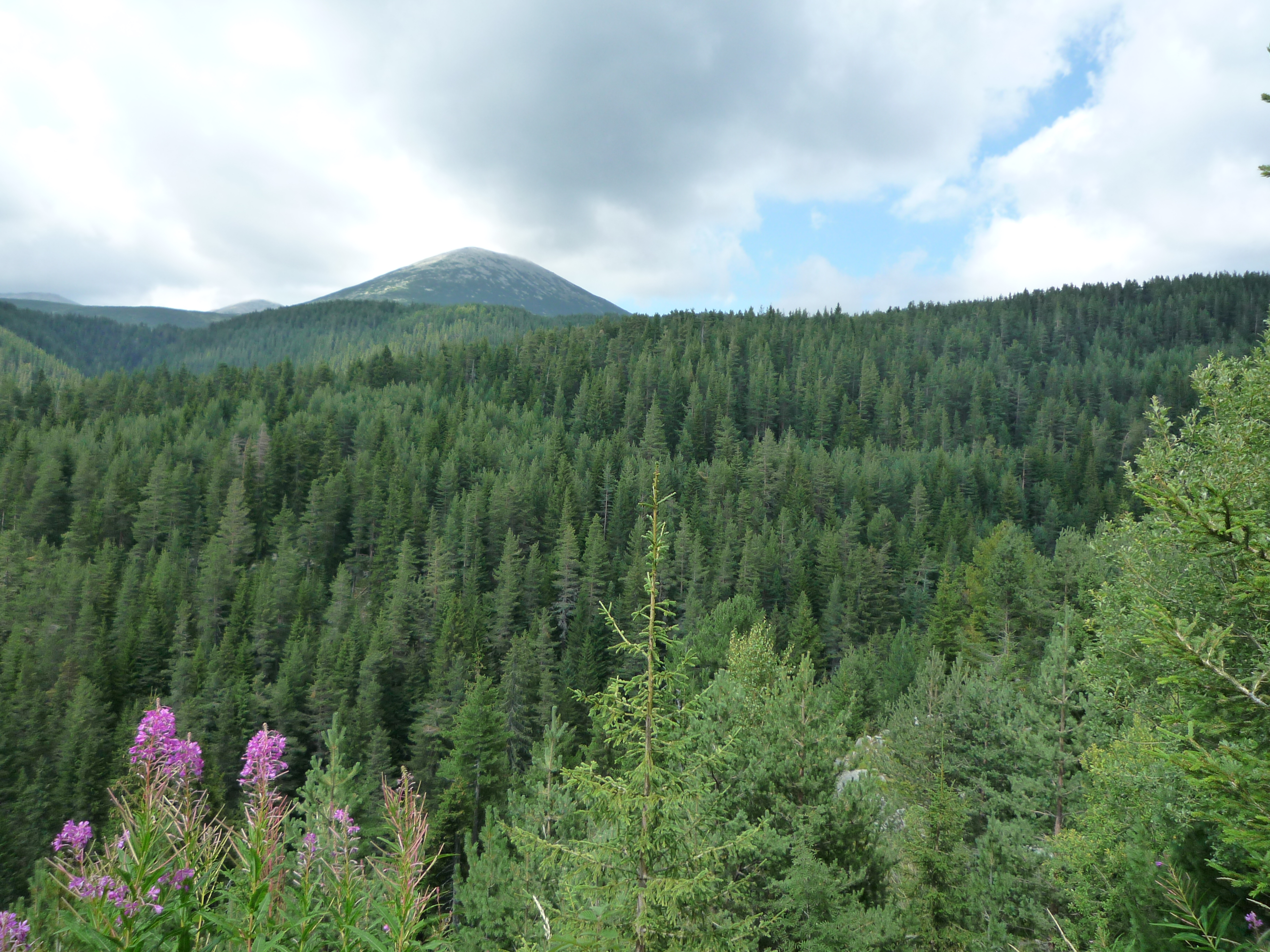

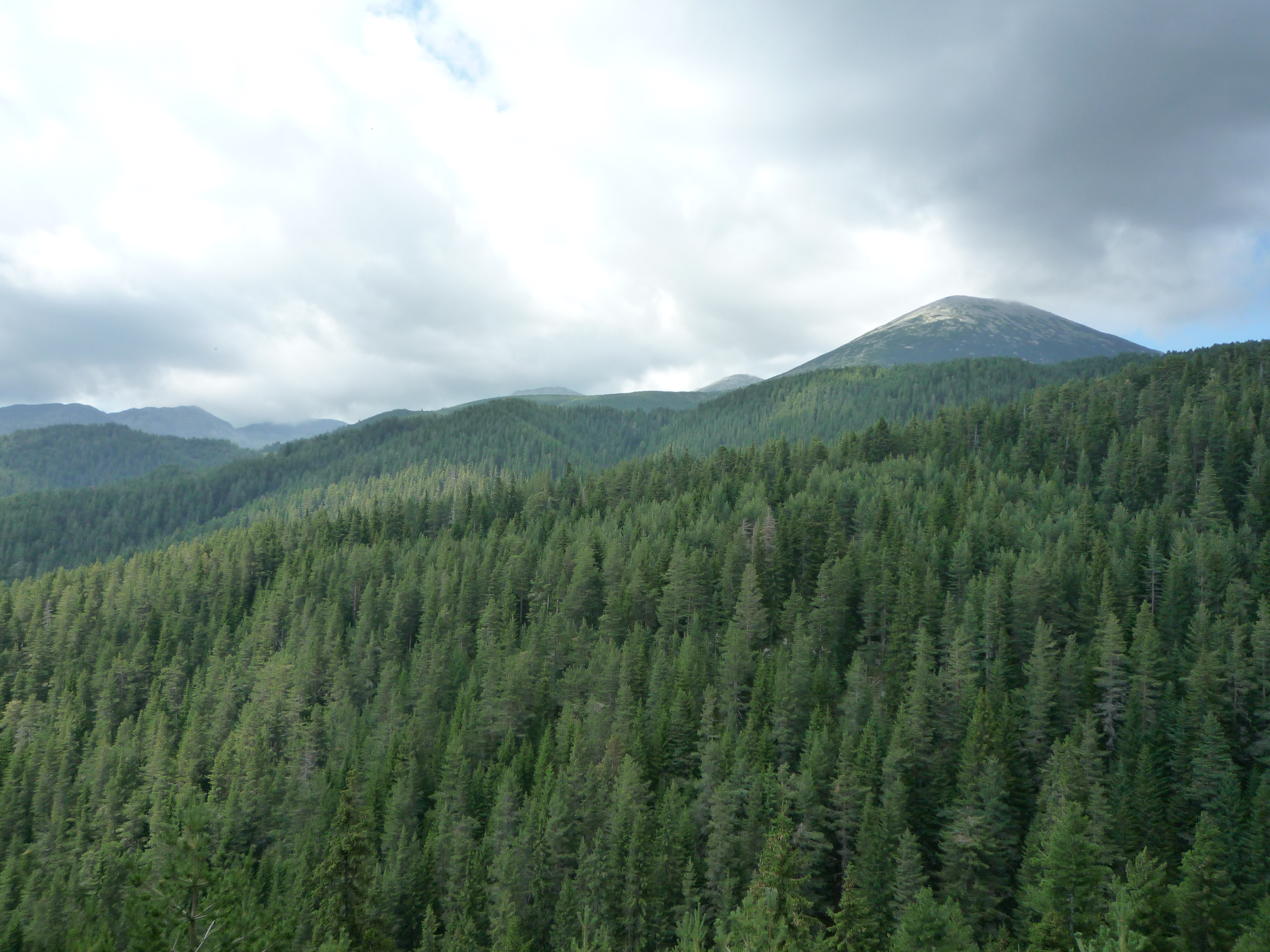
