= Melnishka reka =

Location
- Country: Bulgaria

Physical characteristics
- Source
  - location: Pirin
  - coordinates: 41°38′48.84″N 23°26′35.16″E
  - elevation: 2,409 m (7,904 ft)
- Mouth
  - location: Struma River
  - coordinates: 41°25′42.96″N 23°18′42.12″E
  - elevation: 85 m (279 ft)
- Length: 30 km (19 mi)
- Basin size: 97 km^{2} (37 sq mi)

Basin features
- Progression: Struma→ Aegean Sea

The Melnishka reka (Bulgarian: Мелнишка река) is a river in south-western Bulgaria, a left tributary of the Struma. The river is 30 km long and drains part of the south-western sections of the Pirin mountain range.

The river takes at an altitude of 2,409 m, at about 300 m from the summit of Kelyo (2,484 m). It flows in southeastern direction through most of its course. In its upper stretches Melnishka reka flows through a densely forested valley. Downstream of the village of Doleni, the river enters en eroded valley, where along with its tributary the Sugarevska reka, it runs along the Melnik Earth Pyramids. Near the village of Zornitsa the river enters the Sandanski–Petrich Valley, at the village of Kromidovo it turns westwards and then southwards at the village of Novo Konomladi. It flows into the Struma at an altitude of 85 m at 1.8 km west of the village of Marikostinovo.

Its drainage basin covers a territory of 97 km^{2} or 0.56% of Struma's total.

The Sandanska Bistritsa River has predominantly snow-rain feed with high water in late spring (April–May) and low water in late summer (August–September). The average annual flow is 0.75 m^{3}/s.

There are six settlements along the river: Doleni, Melnik, Lozenitsa and Zornitsa in Sandanski Municipality, as well as Kromidovo, Kapatovo and Novo Konomladi in Petrich Municipality, all in Blagoevgrad Province. The river's waters are utilised for irrigation.
