= Sandanski =

Sandanski Сандански
- Town
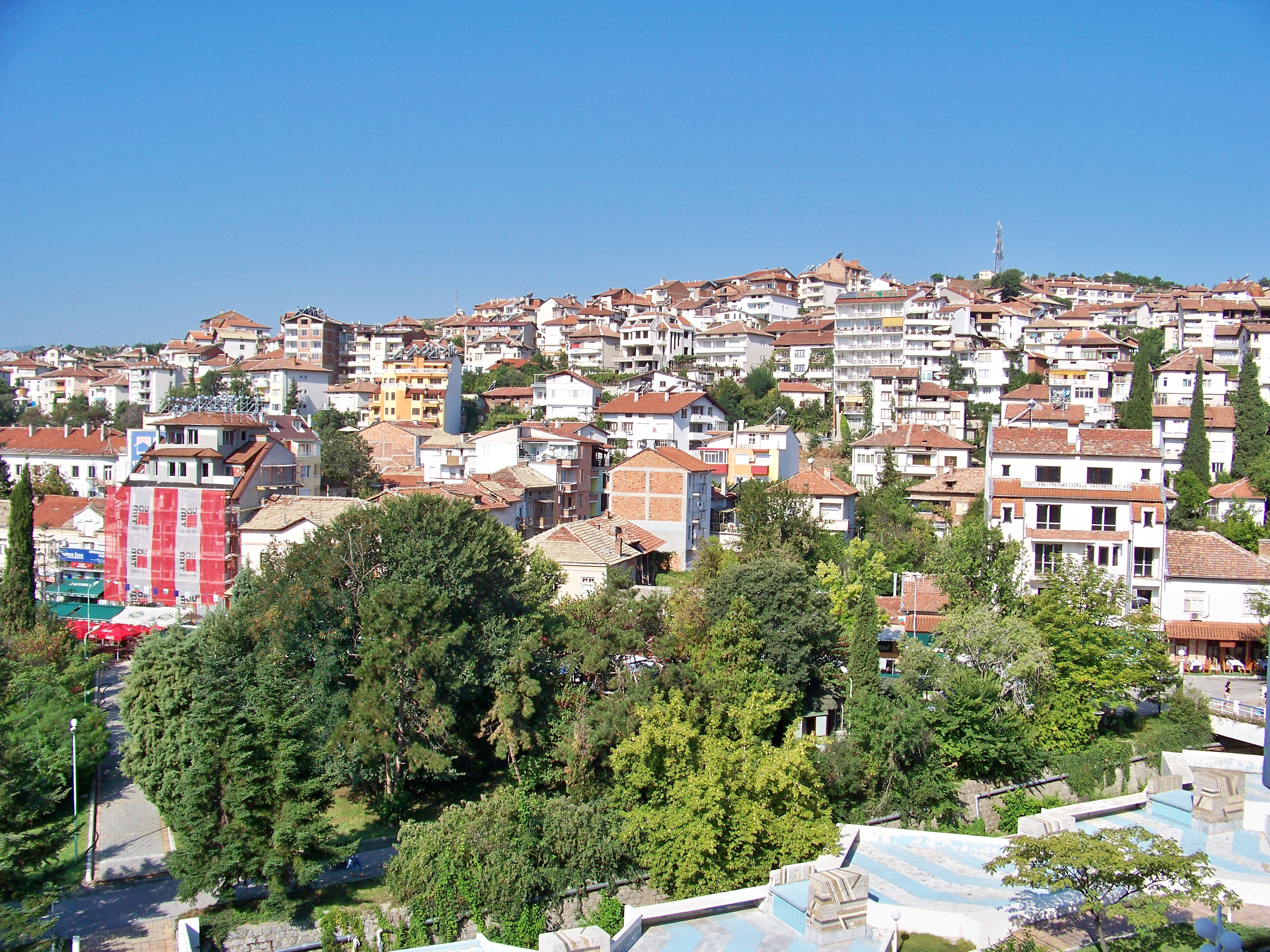

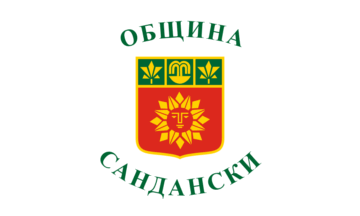
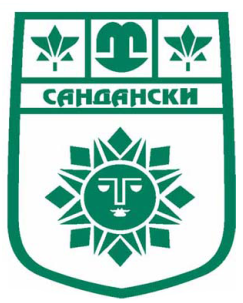
- Flag Coat of arms

- Location of Sandanski
- Coordinates: 41°34′N 23°17′E
- Country: Bulgaria
- Province (Oblast): Blagoevgrad

Government
  - Mayor: Atanas Stoyanov

Area
  - Town: 26.867 km^{2} (10.373 sq mi)
- Elevation: 296 m (971 ft)

Population (Census 2021)
  - Town: 24,682
  - Density: 918.67/km^{2} (2,379.4/sq mi)
  - Urban: 36,335
- Time zone: UTC+2 (EET)
  - Summer (DST): UTC+3 (EEST)
- Postal Code: 2800
- Area code: 0746
- Website: Official website

Sandanski (Bulgarian: Сандански [sɐnˈdanski]; Greek: Σαντάνσκι, formerly known as Sveti Vrach, Bulgarian: Свети Врач, until 1947) is a town and a recreation center in southwestern Bulgaria, part of Blagoevgrad Province. Named after the Macedonian Bulgarian revolutionary Yane Sandanski, it is situated in Sandanski–Petrich Valley at the foot of the Pirin Mountains, along the banks of the Sandanska Bistritsa River. Sandanski is about 20 km away from the Bulgaria-Greece border and 100 km away from the Aegean Sea.

The town has a convenient location, a mild to warm climate (with the highest average annual temperature in the country, +16°C) and a relatively high concentration of thermal water springs, which all make it a popular destination for relaxation and recreation.

== Geography ==
Sandanski is located in the Sandanski–Petrich Valley, surrounded by the Pirin, Belasitsa and Ograzhden mountain ranges. The town is about 160 km south from Bulgaria's capital Sofia along the major European Route E79. Following the same route at almost the same distance is Thessaloniki, Greece's second largest city.

Sandanski has developed in an amphitheatrical fashion on the outer south-west flanks of the Pirin Mountains along the lower reaches of Sandanska Bistritsa River. The town's altitude varies between 240 and 300 meters. Its geographical location between Kresna and Rupel Gorges determines the town's mild winter and unpleasant summer temperatures. Statistically, Sandanski has the warmest temperatures in Bulgaria, with a total of around 2700 annual sunshine hours.

Within a short drive from Sandanski is Melnik, the smallest town in Bulgaria in terms of population, but an attractive tourist destination for its authentic architecture and wine production. In close proximity is the village of Rozhen and the Rozhen Monastery. The Ancient Roman city of Parthicopolis was located nearby.

=== Climate ===
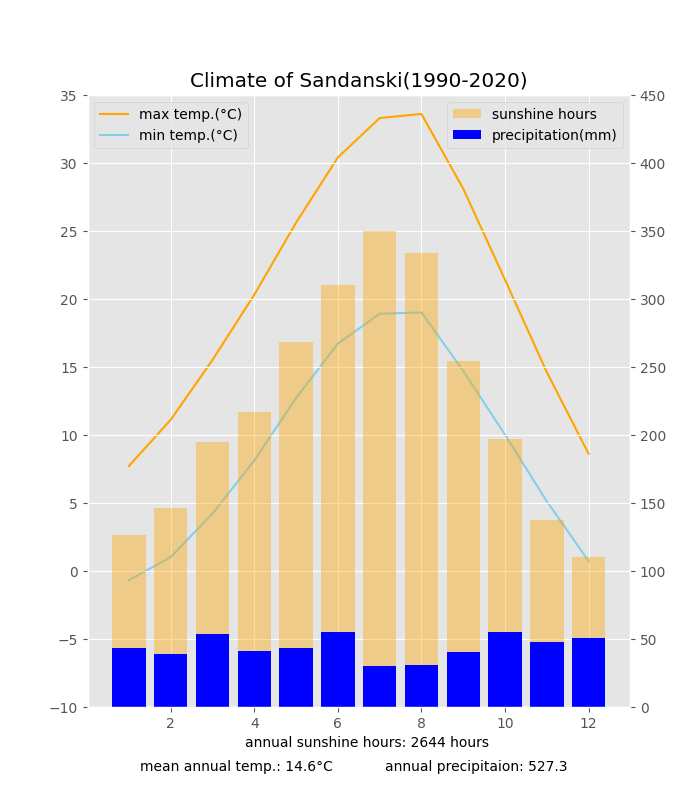
Climate of Sandanski

Sandanski has a temperate climate (Köppen Climate Classification: Cfa). Summers are very hot and dry with occasional thunderstorms, and during heat waves the temperature may exceed 40 °C reaching to 45 °C, the highest recorded temperature in the city. Winters are damp and relatively mild, lasting for about three months from December through February. Springs and falls are generally about two months each. The summer is the longest season in Sandanski, lasting 4 months – from early June to late September. Precipitation is evenly distributed throughout the year except for July and August when droughts often occur.

Climate table:

Climate data for Sandanski (1991–2020), Extremes 1961-2020
Month	Jan	Feb	Mar	Apr	May	Jun	Jul	Aug	Sep	Oct	Nov	Dec	Year
Record high °C (°F)	18.7 (65.7)	22.8 (73.0)	27.8 (82.0)	32.2 (90.0)	36.0 (96.8)	42.0 (107.6)	44.6 (112.3)	42.4 (108.3)	38.9 (102.0)	33.4 (92.1)	27.0 (80.6)	22.9 (73.2)	44.6 (112.3)
Mean daily maximum °C (°F)	7.7 (45.9)	11.1 (52.0)	15.5 (59.9)	20.3 (68.5)	25.6 (78.1)	30.4 (86.7)	33.3 (91.9)	33.6 (92.5)	28.1 (82.6)	21.4 (70.5)	14.6 (58.3)	8.6 (47.5)	20.9 (69.6)
Daily mean °C (°F)	3.1 (37.6)	5.5 (41.9)	9.4 (48.9)	13.9 (57.0)	18.9 (66.0)	23.4 (74.1)	25.9 (78.6)	25.9 (78.6)	20.9 (69.6)	14.9 (58.8)	9.2 (48.6)	4.2 (39.6)	14.6 (58.3)
Mean daily minimum °C (°F)	−0.7 (30.7)	1.0 (33.8)	4.2 (39.6)	8.1 (46.6)	12.7 (54.9)	16.7 (62.1)	18.9 (66.0)	19.0 (66.2)	14.7 (58.5)	10.0 (50.0)	5.1 (41.2)	0.7 (33.3)	9.2 (48.6)
Record low °C (°F)	−21.0 (−5.8)	−13.9 (7.0)	−10.4 (13.3)	−6.5 (20.3)	1.8 (35.2)	5.9 (42.6)	10.0 (50.0)	8.2 (46.8)	3.0 (37.4)	−2.7 (27.1)	−12.0 (10.4)	−16.2 (2.8)	−21.0 (−5.8)
Average precipitation mm (inches)	39 (1.5)	34 (1.3)	44 (1.7)	43 (1.7)	45 (1.8)	47 (1.9)	34 (1.3)	30 (1.2)	37 (1.5)	51 (2.0)	46 (1.8)	55 (2.2)	504 (19.8)
Average precipitation days (≥ 1 mm)	6	6	6	6	7	6	5	3	5	5	6	7	67
Average relative humidity (%)	75	71	66	62	62	59	54	55	59	67	77	78	65
Mean monthly sunshine hours	126	146	195	217	268	310	350	334	254	197	134	110	2,641
Mean daily daylight hours	9.6	10.6	12.0	13.4	14.5	15.1	14.8	13.8	12.5	11.1	9.9	9.2	12.2
Source: NOAA NCEI(Humidity 1961-1990)Weather atlas(Daylight hours)

Climate data for Sandanski (1981–2010), Precipitation (2010-2020)
Month	Jan	Feb	Mar	Apr	May	Jun	Jul	Aug	Sep	Oct	Nov	Dec	Year
Record high °C (°F)	18.0 (64.4)	21.9 (71.4)	30.0 (86.0)	31.5 (88.7)	36.8 (98.2)	42.0 (107.6)	44.6 (112.3)	42.5 (108.5)	38.7 (101.7)	34.6 (94.3)	26.0 (78.8)	22.9 (73.2)	44.6 (112.3)
Mean daily maximum °C (°F)	7.0 (44.6)	10.2 (50.4)	14.9 (58.8)	20.5 (68.9)	26.5 (79.7)	30.1 (86.2)	32.9 (91.2)	32.8 (91.0)	28.9 (84.0)	22.3 (72.1)	15.5 (59.9)	9.7 (49.5)	20.9 (69.6)
Daily mean °C (°F)	3.5 (38.3)	5.6 (42.1)	9.5 (49.1)	14.5 (58.1)	19.5 (67.1)	24.2 (75.6)	27.6 (81.7)	27.3 (81.1)	21.7 (71.1)	15.6 (60.1)	10.5 (50.9)	4.9 (40.8)	15.4 (59.7)
Mean daily minimum °C (°F)	−0.1 (31.8)	1.0 (33.8)	4.5 (40.1)	9.1 (48.4)	13.5 (56.3)	17.1 (62.8)	19.5 (67.1)	19.3 (66.7)	15.3 (59.5)	10.7 (51.3)	5.2 (41.4)	1.7 (35.1)	9.7 (49.5)
Record low °C (°F)	−21.0 (−5.8)	−15.3 (4.5)	−9.4 (15.1)	−4.3 (24.3)	1.5 (34.7)	6.7 (44.1)	8.8 (47.8)	6.5 (43.7)	1.0 (33.8)	−2.1 (28.2)	−7.5 (18.5)	−16.9 (1.6)	−21.0 (−5.8)
Average precipitation mm (inches)	43.1 (1.70)	38.4 (1.51)	53.7 (2.11)	40.9 (1.61)	43.4 (1.71)	54.9 (2.16)	29.7 (1.17)	30.3 (1.19)	40.4 (1.59)	54.8 (2.16)	47.5 (1.87)	50.3 (1.98)	527.3 (20.76)
Average precipitation days (≥ 1 mm)	5.3	5.3	5.2	6.2	6.9	5.6	4.5	3.5	4.2	5.3	6.3	7.8	66.1
Average snowy days	5.1	2.4	0.6	0.1	0.0	0.0	0.0	0.0	0.0	0.0	0.6	3.2	11.9
Mean monthly sunshine hours	123	144	211	232	286	311	369	348	256	212	131	100	2,723
Percentage possible sunshine	43	49	52	54	60	69	77	78	70	58	45	36	60
Source: stringmeteo.com

== Municipality ==
Sandanski is the seat of Sandanski Municipality, which includes the following 54 places:

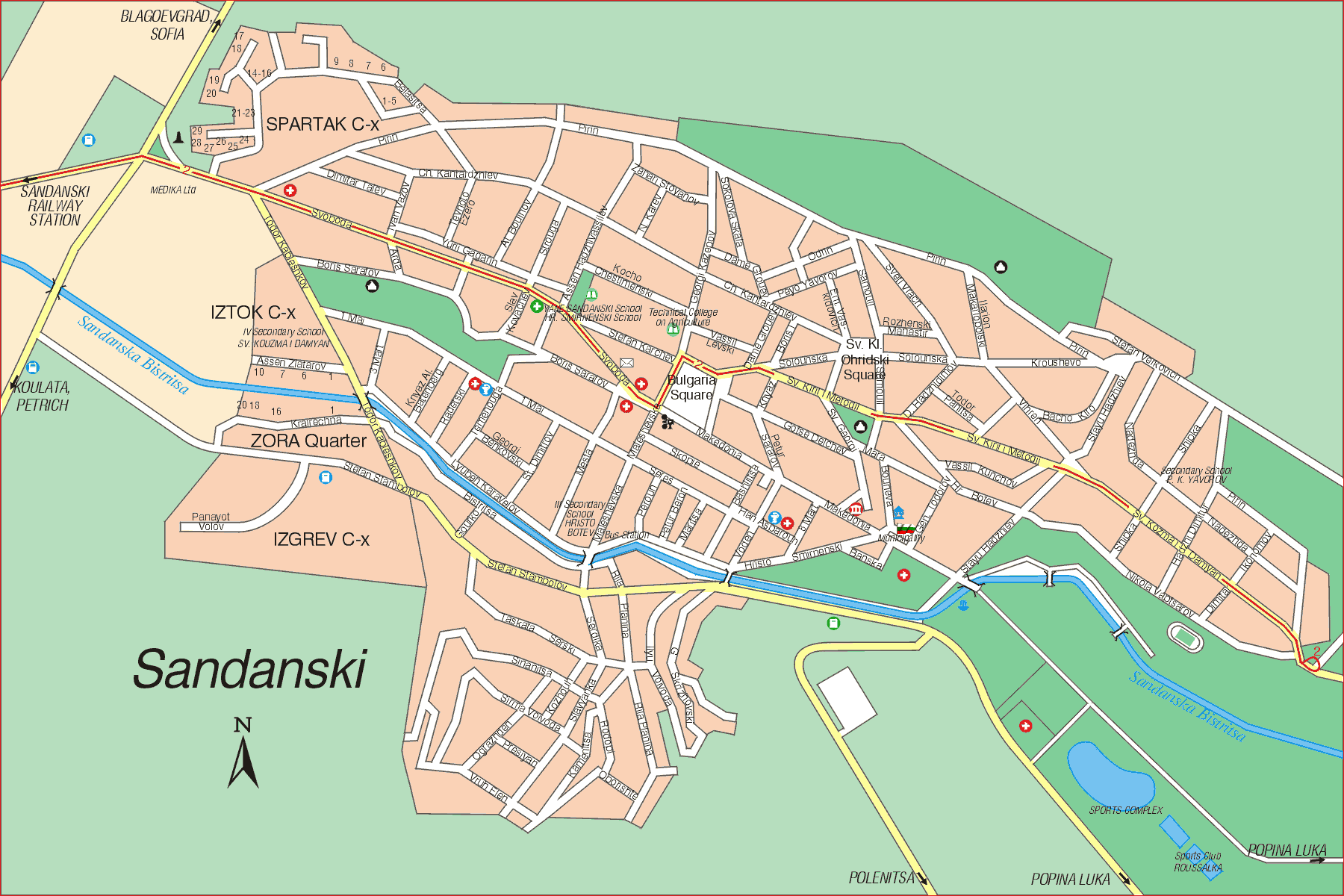
Map of Sandanski, Bulgaria

- Belevehchevo
- Belyovo
- Bozhdovo
- Chereshnitsa
- Damyanitsa
- Debrene
- Doleni
- Dzhigurovo
- Golem Tsalim
- Goleshovo
- Gorna Sushitsa
- Gorno Spanchevo
- Harsovo
- Hotovo
- Hrasna
- Kalimantsi
- Karlanovo
- Katuntsi
- Kashina
- Kovachevo
- Krastiltsi
- Ladarevo
- Laskarevo
- Lebnitsa
- Lehovo
- Levunovo
- Leshnitsa
- Lilyanovo
- Lozenitsa
- Lyubovishte
- Lyubovka
- Malki Tsalim
- Melnik
- Novo Delchevo
- Novo Hodzhovo
- Petrovo
- Piperitsa
- Pirin
- Ploski
- Polenitsa
- Rozhen
- Sandanski
- Sklave
- Spatovo
- Stozha
- Struma
- Sugarevo
- Valkovo
- Vinogradi
- Vihren
- Vranya
- Yanovo
- Zlatolist
- Zornitsa

== Honour ==
Sandanski Point on Livingston Island in the South Shetland Islands, Antarctica is named after the town of Sandanski.
