= Pirinska Bistritsa =

Pirinska Bistritsa, Mpístritsas
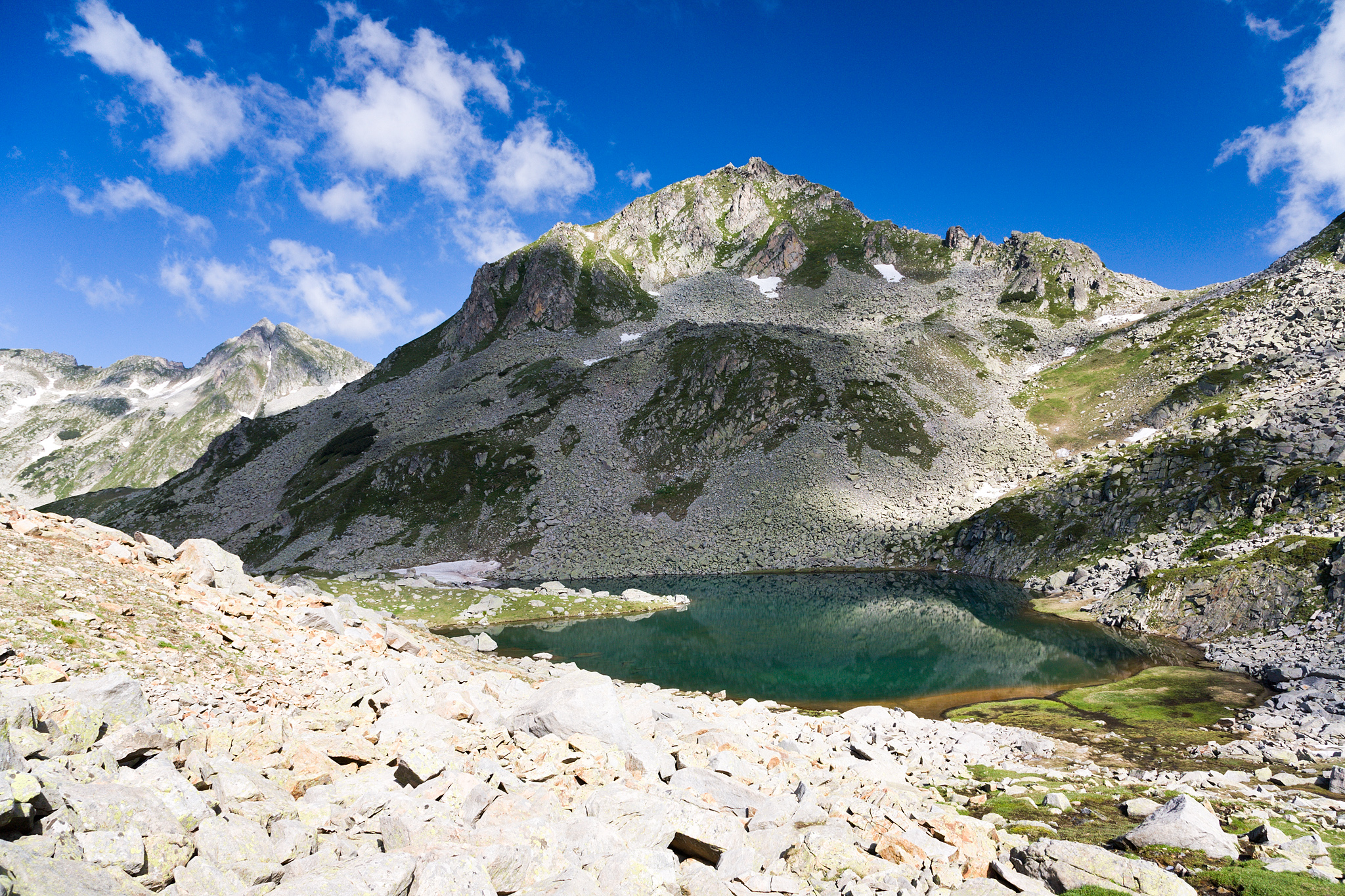
- The source of Pirinska Bistritsa at the southern shore of Argirovo Lake

Location
- Country: Bulgaria, Greece

Physical characteristics
- Source
  - location: Argirovo Lake, Pirin
  - coordinates: 41°41′27.96″N 23°30′30.96″E
  - elevation: 2,365 m (7,759 ft)
- Mouth
  - location: Struma River
  - coordinates: 41°21′54″N 23°20′31.92″E
  - elevation: 69 m (226 ft)
- Length: 53 km (33 mi)
- Basin size: 507 km^{2} (196 sq mi)

Basin features
- Progression: Struma→ Aegean Sea

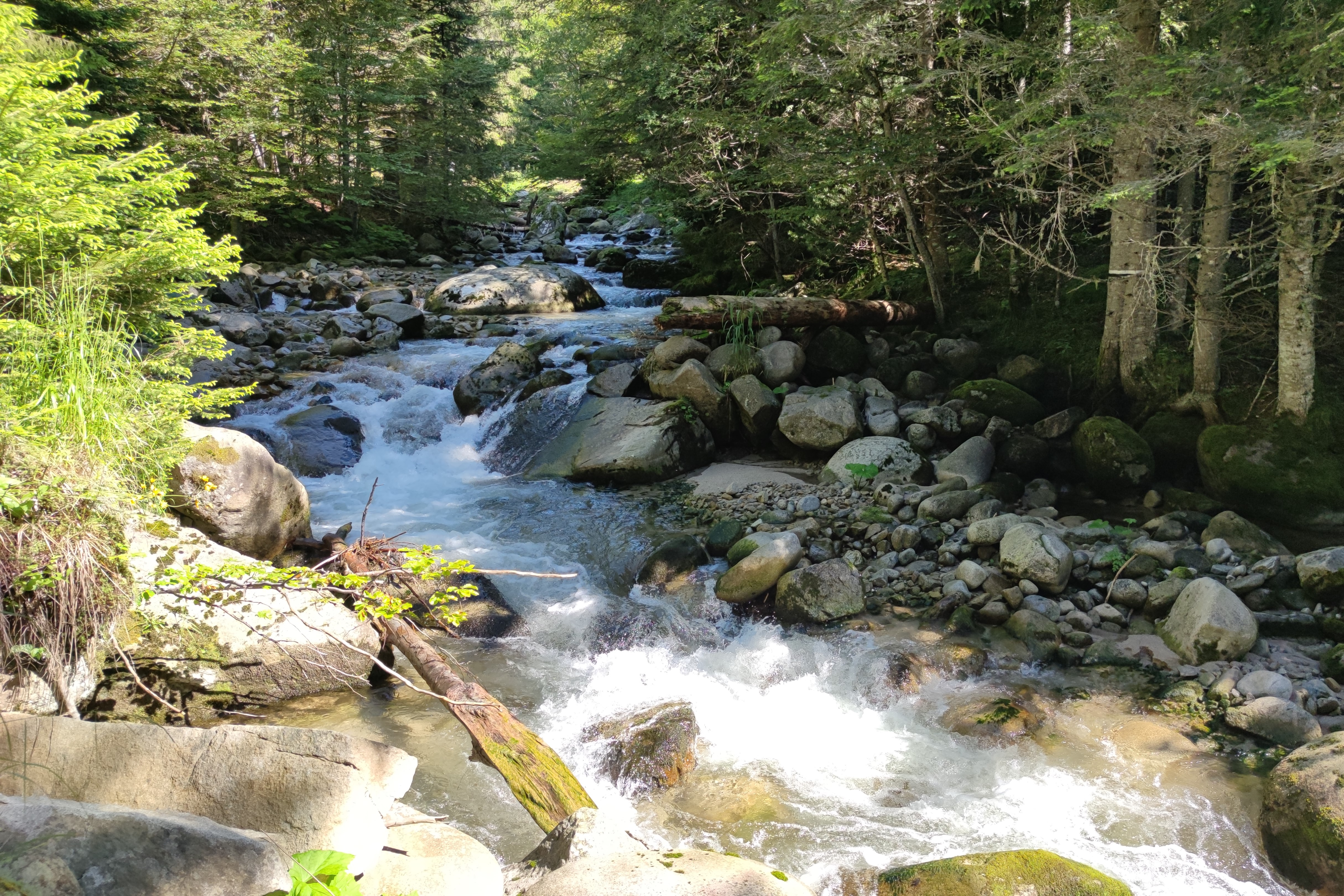
View from the upper reaches of the Pirinska Bistritsa River

The Pirinska Bistritsa or Mpístritsas (Bulgarian: Пиринска Бистрица, Greek: Μπίστριτσας) is a river in south-western Bulgaria and northern Greece, a left tributary of the Struma. The river is 53 km long; the last 7 km before its confluence with the Struma forms the border between Bulgaria and Greece. Pirinska Bistritsa drains the south-western sections of the Pirin mountain range and the northern sections of the Slavyanka mountain range.

The river springs from the southern shore of the Argirovo glacial lake in situated in the Demirkapia cirque in Northern Pirin at an altitude of 2,365 m. It flows in southern direction in a deep valley. Near Pirin refuge it turns to the southeast and enters a densely forested area, where it again flows southwards. At the village of Pirin the river takes a sharp turn to the southwest and enters a sparsely forested valley with eroded slopes. At the village of Katuntsi it enters the Sandanski–Petrich Valley, where the river bed widens. At half a kilometer south of the village of Novo Hodzhovo is the confluence with the river Petrovska reka. From that point it forms the border between Bulgaria and Greece until its confluence with the Struma at an altitude of 69 m between the villages of Kulata and Promachonas.

Its drainage basin covers a territory of 507 km^{2} or 2.93% of Struma's total.

The Pirinska Bistritsa River has predominantly snow-rain feed with high water in late spring (May) and low water in late summer (September). The average annual flow is 3.35 m^{3}/s at the village of Pirin.

There are four settlements along the river, all of them situated in Sandanski Municipality: Pirin, Gorno Spanchevo, Katuntsi and Novo Hodzhovo. The river's waters are utilised for irrigation and electrical power generation.
