= Banderishki Chukar =

Banderishki Chukar (Бъндеришки чукар)
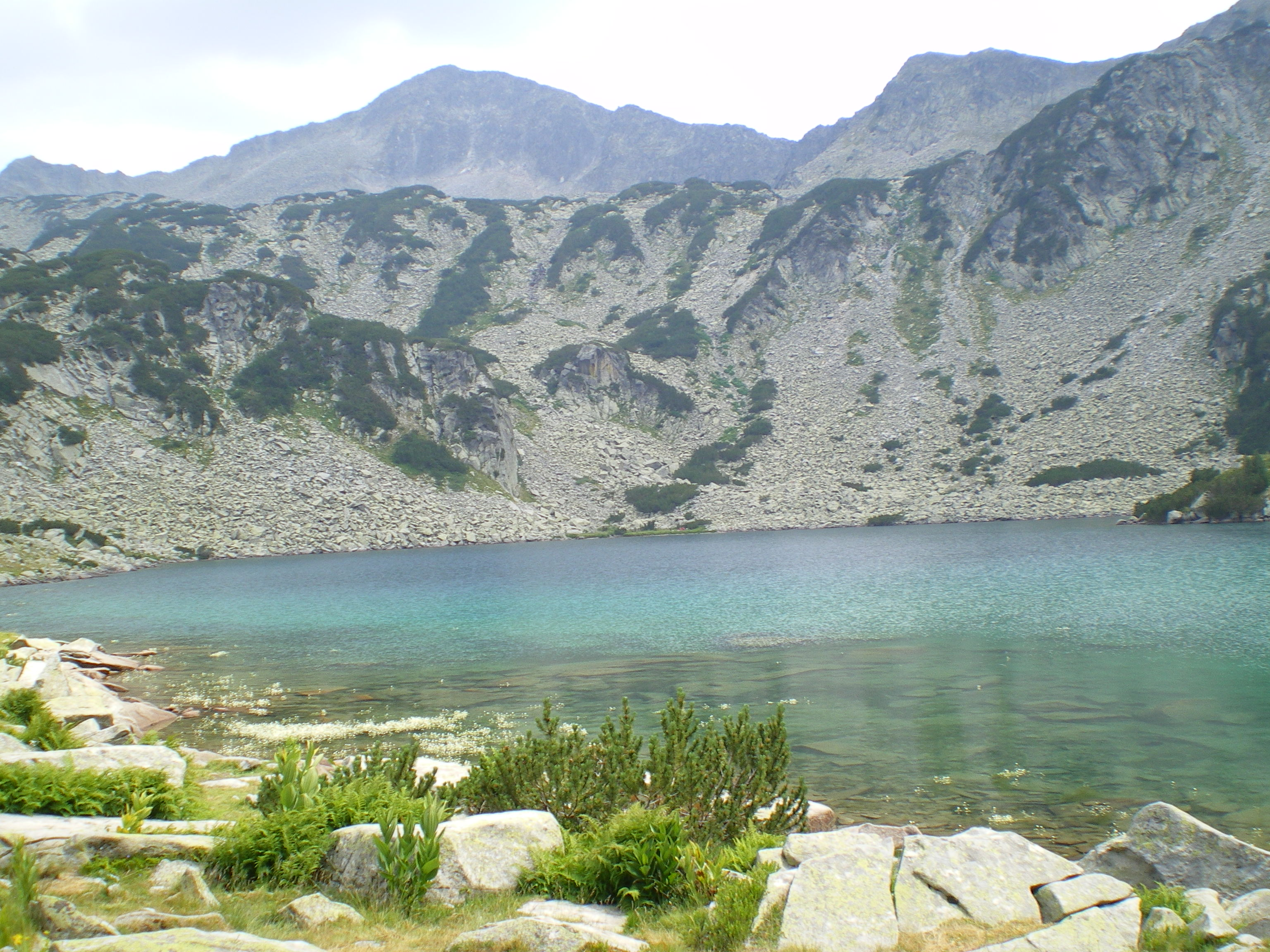
- Banderishki Chukar seen from the Banderishki Lakes

Highest point
- Elevation: 2,763 m (9,065 ft)
- Coordinates: 41°43′39.62″N 23°25′21.34″E

Geography
- Location: Blagoevgrad Province, Bulgaria
- Parent range: Pirin Mountains

Banderishki Chukar (Bulgarian: Бъндеришки чукар) is a 2,737 m (8,980 ft) peak in the Pirin mountain range, south-western Bulgaria. It is located in the northern part of Pirin on the main mountain ridge, of which it is the highest granite peak. It is the 12th highest summit in Pirin.

Banderishki Chukar is situated at the bottom on the Banderitsa valley. It forms the southernmost point of this part of the main ridge, as it then stretches slightly in northern direction. Viewed from the north, the summit has an alpine look, but in fact most of its slope is a steep field of moraines, descending to Dalgoto Lake of the Banderishki Lakes group. To the south there is a short lateral ridge, on which is located the Bashliyski Chukar peak, 2,683 m (8,802 ft). On the northern side of the summit there is a climbing tour of category II "b".

Although there are no marked tourist tracks, Banderishki Chukar is easily accessible. The starting points for ascending the peak are Demyanitsa and Vihren villages.
