= List of Bulgarian wine regions =

Wine-making terroirs in Bulgaria

The following is a list of Bulgarian wine regions. Wine is, together with beer and grape rakia, among the most popular alcoholic beverages in Bulgaria.

== Regions for Production of Regional Wines ==
- Danubian (Danube) Plain. In the US, this appellation is also approved as Danube River Plains.
- Thracian Lowlands. In the US, this appellation is also approved as Thracian Valley.

== Regions with Guaranteed and Controlled Appellation of Origin (GCAO) ==
=== Northern Bulgaria ===
- Black Sea GCAO
- Euxinograd GCAO
- Han Krum GCAO
- Novi Pazar GCAO
- Novo Selo GCAO
- Lovech GCAO
- Lozitsa GCAO
- Lyaskovets GCAO
- Pavlikeni GCAO
- Pleven GCAO
- Rousse GCAO
- Svishtov GCAO
- Varbitsa GCAO
- Vidin GCAO

=== Southern Bulgaria ===
- Asenovgrad GCAO
- Brestnik GCAO
- Harsovo GCAO
- Haskovo GCAO
- Hissarya GCAO
- Ivaylovgrad GCAO
- Karnobat GCAO
- Karlovo GCAO
- Lyubimets GCAO
- Melnik GCAO
- Nova Zagora GCAO
- Oryahovitsa GCAO
- Perushtitsa GCAO
- Pomorie GCAO
- Plovdiv GCAO
- Sakar GCAO
- Sandanski GCAO
- Septemvri GCAO
- Shivachevo GCAO
- Sliven GCAO
- Svilengrad GCAO
- Sungurlare GCAO
- South Black Sea GCAO
- Stambolovo GCAO
- Stara Zagora GCAO
- Struma Valley GCAO
- Yambol GCAO
