= Belevehchevo =

Belevehchevo Белевехчево
- Village
- Location within Bulgaria
- Coordinates: 41°34′N 23°19′E
- Country: Bulgaria
- Province: Blagoevgrad Province
- Municipality: Sandanski

Area
  - Total: 1.87 km^{2} (0.72 sq mi)
- Elevation: 364 m (1,194 ft)

Population (2013)
  - Total: 1
- Time zone: UTC+2 (EET)
  - Summer (DST): UTC+3 (EEST)
- Postal code: 2800

Belevehchevo (Bulgarian: Белевехчево) is a village in Sandanski Municipality, Blagoevgrad Province, south-western Bulgaria and as of 2013 has only 1 inhabitant. It lies at the south-western foothills of the Pirin mountains facing the Sandanski-Petrich Valley. It is located at about 1 km east of the municipal centre Sandanski and some 124 km south of the national capital Sofia.

In 1873 it had 32 households and 100 inhabitants, all of them Bulgarians. At the outbreak of the First Balkan War in 1912 13 people from Belevehchevo joined the Macedonian-Adrianopolitan Volunteer Corps that was formed in support the Bulgarian war effort against the Ottoman Empire.
