= Rupel (disambiguation) =

Rupel can be:

- Rupel is a river in Belgium
- Rupel (ship), a gaff rigged wooden schooner (1992-1996) from the Netherlands
- Rupel Pass in Greece
- Rupel Fort in Greece

Rupel is also a Slovene surname:

- Anja Rupel, Slovene singer
- Dimitrij Rupel, Slovene politician
