= Valentin Dartilov =

Bulgarian footballer

Personal information
- Date of birth: 14 August 1967 (age 59)
- Place of birth: Katuntsi, Bulgaria
- Position: Defender

Youth career
- Pirin Blagoevgrad

Senior career*
Years	Team	Apps	(Gls)
1986–1990	Pirin Blagoevgrad	81	(4)
1990–1997	Levski Sofia	149	(1)
1995	→ Kayserispor (loan)	3	(0)
1997–1999	Kremikovtsi		
1999–2000	Iskar Sofia		
2000–2001	Hebar Pazardzhik	25	(1)

International career
1988–1990	Bulgaria U21	29	(0)
1995	Bulgaria	1	(0)
- * Club domestic league appearances and goals

Valentin Dartilov (Bulgarian: Валентин Дъртилов; born 14 August 1967) is a former Bulgarian footballer who was deployed as a defender.

== Career ==
Dartilov played 148 A PFG matches and scored 1 goal for Levski Sofia between 1990 and 1997, winning three consecutive league titles (1993–1995) and three Bulgarian Cups with the team. In European club tournaments, he has 10 matches and 1 goal under his belt. Considered one of the top defenders in the Balkans at the time, in 1992 he went close to being transferred to Fenerbahçe in neighbouring Turkey.
