= Lehovo =

Lehovo Лехово
- Village
- Location within Bulgaria
- Coordinates: 41°24′39″N 23°29′9″E
- Country: Bulgaria
- Province: Blagoevgrad Province
- Municipality: Sandanski

Population (2007)
  - Total: 5
- Time zone: UTC+2 (EET)
  - Summer (DST): UTC+3 (EEST)

Lehovo (Bulgarian: Лехово) is a village in the municipality of Sandanski, in Blagoevgrad Province, southwestern Bulgaria.

Located in the northwestern reaches of the Slavyanka (Alibotush) mountain, Lehovo enjoys a transitional Mediterranean climate. Lehovo is part of the historical region of Marvashko, once a major mining and iron smithing area spanning the western part of the modern Bulgarian–Greek border. Lehovo lies east of the Kulata–Promachonas border crossing, southeast of Sandanski, northeast of Sidirokastro and just to the northeast of Agkistro.

After 1913, the village's former land remained within Greek territory, just a kilometer to the south, and all of its residents resettled to the village's present location within the borders of Bulgaria. Several accounts and leads point that Lehovo was originally populated by Polish and/or other Central European miners, who were subsequently Bulgarianized.

== History ==
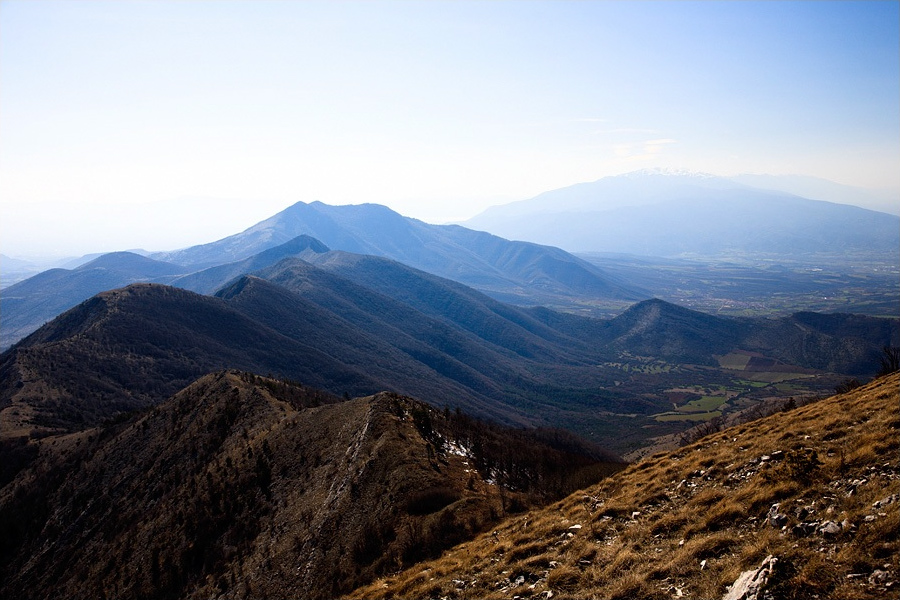
View towards the old land of Lehovo ("Krasochori", middle right) within Greece from the Lipa area in Slavyanka. Agkistro is to be seen far in the distance behind the hill to the right.

Lehovo was refounded at its present location by Bulgarian refugees from what became Greek Macedonia in 1913. After the Treaty of Bucharest that followed the Second Balkan War, Lehovo's previous lands ended up just on the Greek side of the border. As a result, the locals refounded Lehovo 1 kilometre (0.62 miles) to the north, within Bulgarian territory.

The settlement that remained in Greece was renamed from Lechovon (Λέχοβον) to Krasochori (Κρασοχώρι) in 1927 and as of 2016, was depopulated. As of 2011, the modern Lehovo in Bulgaria had a population of just 5, all of them ethnic Bulgarians.

The old Lehovo was mentioned as Lefevo and Lehovo in Ottoman tax registers of 1611–1617 and 1623–1625 as an entirely Christian settlement of 186 and 167 households respectively. Until the end of the 19th century, Lehovo was a major local centre of iron mining and metallurgy. Magnetite sand was extracted nearby and processed in several furnaces and a forge (samokov).

In the late 19th century, Lehovo was a relatively large village with an ethnically homogeneous Christian Bulgarian population. In 1873, its population was given as 780. In 1900, ethnographer Vasil Kanchov recorded it as 1,250 and in 1905, Dimitar Mishev counted 1,680 Bulgarians in Lehovo, all under the jurisdiction of the Bulgarian Exarchate.

== Ethnic origins ==
Numerous leads suggest that the population of Lehovo likely stems from settlers that arrived from Central Europe in order to boost the local metallurgy. In the late 19th century, the locals of Lehovo were regarded as clearly distinct by the neighbouring Bulgarian villages in terms of their Bulgarian dialect, dress, customs and even visual appearance.

The account of Vasil Kanchov, who visited the old Lehovo in 1891, describes the locals as follows:

[Lehovo's] residents differ much from the neighbouring villagers. They speak differently. They wear clothes, different from those of the neighbouring people. They all have light blond hair. The surrounding population often jokes at their expense and calls them clumsy. The villagers say that the Lehovo people are alien to these lands, that some tsar had brought them there to dig ore in the Rupel mountain. It is to be believed that they were brought from Poland or Germany and were Bulgarianized.

— Vasil Kanchov, A Journey in the Valleys of the Struma, Mesta and Bregalnica. The Regions of Bitola, Prespa and Ohrid

Diplomat and researcher Atanas Shopov's description of Lehovo from 1893 offers similar insights:

... the residents of the village of Lehovo, who until nowadays differ from the residents of the other villages in their facial features as well as their slyness. Most of them are blond, whereas the Marvatsi [the local ethnographic group] are in general black-eyed. It is said that these settlers were of Polish origins...

— Atanas Shopov, From the Life and Situation of the Bulgarians in the Vilayets

The etymology of the village's name points strongly to an original Polish settlement. According to Yordan V. Ivanov, and as also reported in Shopov's account, Lehovo's name stems from Lech, a common appellation for the Polish people.

Prof. Georgi K. Georgiev considers the original settlers of Lehovo to be Slavic ore miners who were resettled to the Marvashko region from Hungary or Transylvania in the mid-16th century.
