= Ruslan Ivanov (footballer) =

Bulgarian footballer

Personal information
- Full name: Ruslan Georgiev Ivanov
- Date of birth: 19 February 1987 (age 39)
- Place of birth: Sklave, Bulgaria
- Height: 1.86 m (6 ft 1 in)
- Position: Midfielder

Team information
- Current team: Vihren Sandanski
- Number: 7

Senior career*
Years	Team	Apps	(Gls)
2006–2010	Vihren Sandanski	56	(1)
2009	→ Bansko (loan)	14	(1)
2010–2011	Pirin Blagoevgrad	24	(0)
2011–2012	Vidima-Rakovski	22	(1)
2012–2015	Bansko	78	(3)
2016	Episkopi	0	(0)
2016–2017	Litex Lovech	?	(2)
2017	Bansko	15	(5)
2018–2019	Hebar Pazardzhik	48	(27)
2019–2020	Pirin Blagoevgrad	15	(1)
2020–2021	Septemvri Simitli	14	(3)
2021	Vihren Sandanski	8	(2)
2021–2022	Chavdar Etropole	19	(2)
2022	Kyustendil	?	(1)
2022–	Vihren Sandanski		
- * Club domestic league appearances and goals as of 13 April 2022

Ruslan Ivanov (Bulgarian: Руслан Иванов; born 19 February 1987) is a Bulgarian footballer who plays for Vihren Sandanski as a midfielder.
