= Petrovo, Blagoevgrad Province =

- Village
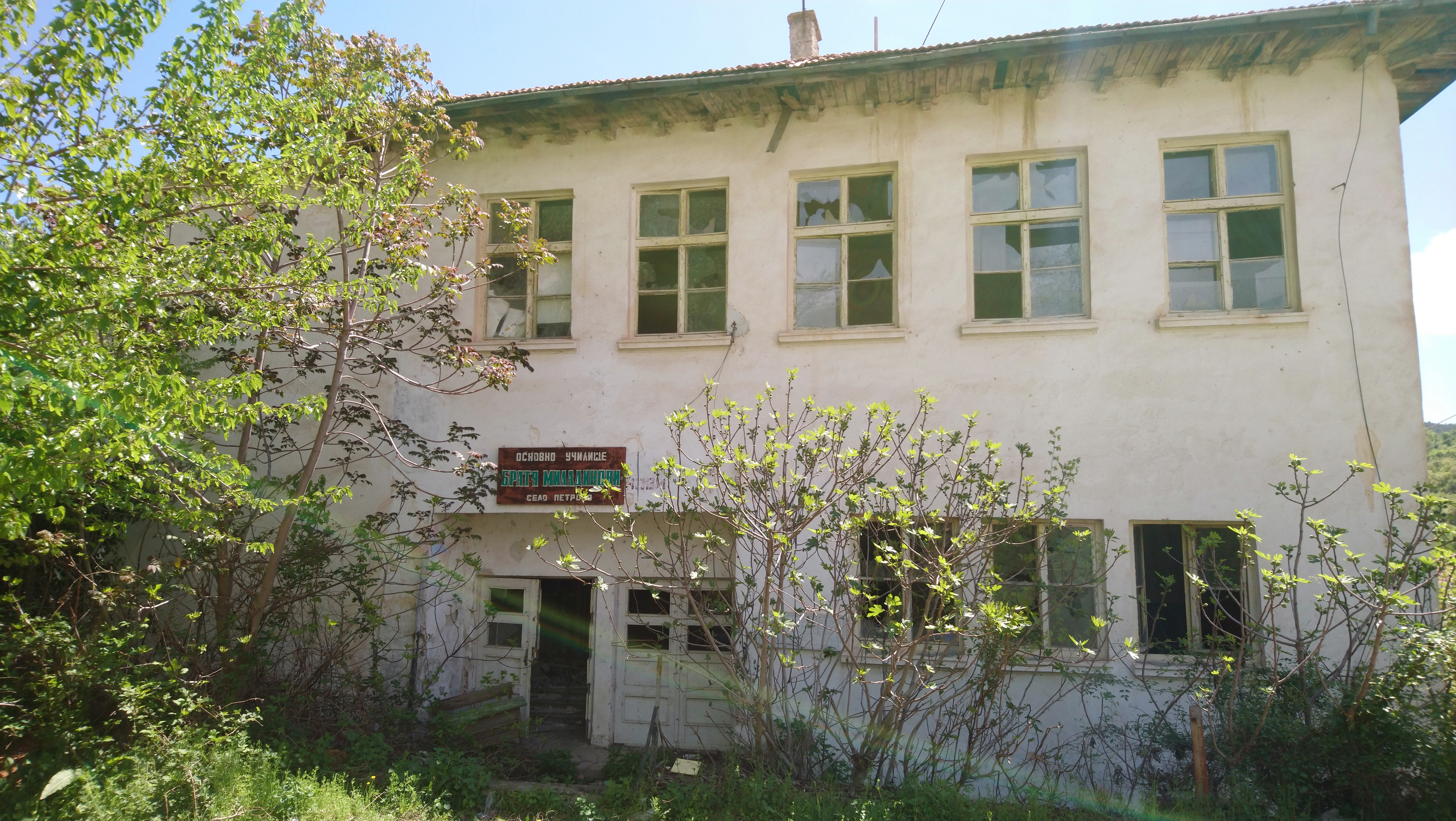
- The former Bratya Miladinovi school in Petrovo

- Location within Bulgaria
- Coordinates: 41°26′20″N 23°30′15″E
- Country: Bulgaria
- Province: Blagoevgrad Province
- Municipality: Sandanski
- Time zone: UTC+2 (EET)
  - Summer (DST): UTC+3 (EEST)

Petrovo, Blagoevgrad Province is a village in the municipality of Sandanski, in Blagoevgrad Province, Bulgaria.

== Geography ==
The village is located in a mountainous area at the northern foot of Slavyanka, close to the Greek border. 6 kilometers away from the village there is an area known as Izvora, where the Petrovska river originates. The river provides drinking water for 15 villages in the region.

== History ==
=== Ottoman rule ===
During the Ottoman rule in 19th century, the village was often part of the kaza of Demirhisar of the Sanjak of Serres. Towards the end of the 19th century, the village was visited by Alexandre Sinvet, a French cartographer who studied in the Ottoman Empire and visited various settlements in Macedonia and Thrace. He called the village Petrovon and claimed that it had population of 240 Greek Christians.

Another ethnographic study from 1878 calls the village Petrovo and claims that 120 Muslims and 200 Christian Bulgarians live there. The number of households was 200. The Bulgarian scientist Georgi Strezov, who also visited the village in 1891 and talked about its customs and manners, stated that 400 Turks and 450 Bulgarians live in Petrovo. According to Vasil Kanchov's statistics, in 1900 there were 950 Bulgarian-Christians, 280 Turks and 120 Vlachs living in the village.

=== Balkan Wars and The Petrovo Massacre ===
The village came under Bulgarian control during the Balkan wars. The area was dominated by Yane Sandanski. During the wars, a large part of the Muslim population fled from the incoming Christian armies. Only the Turks living in Petrovo did not leave their native village, as there was an agreement between Christians and Muslims to protect each other. When the Ottoman army retreated, no Christians were injured or killed, but when the village was captured by the Bulgarians, only a few Turkish women were left alive to be the voivodes' wives. The remaining Muslim residents were burned alive in the village cafe. Some of the orphaned children were adopted by Christian Bulgarians.The massacre happened without the knowledge of Yane Sandanski. Some of the older girls were sent to Kalimantsi to work as maids. Some of these children and their descendants, who were adopted by the Bulgarians, still remember these events and, according to them, the reason for the massacre was to seize the lands from the hands of the Turks.

== Population ==
According to the 2011 census, 628 Bulgarians and 8 Turks live in the village of Petrovo, and three are in the category of "did not answer"
