= Polenitsa =

Polenitsa Поленица
- Location of Polenitsa
- Coordinates: 41°34′N 23°18′E
- Country: Bulgaria
- Provinces (Oblast): Blagoevgrad

Government
  - Mayor: Anton Totev
- Elevation: 345 m (1,132 ft)

Population (2008)
  - Total: 1,150
- Time zone: UTC+2 (EET)
  - Summer (DST): UTC+3 (EEST)
- Postal Code: 2804
- Area code: 0746
- License plate: B

Polenitsa (Bulgarian: Поленица) is a village in South West Bulgaria in Blagoevgrad Province, 159 km from the capital city of Sofia and 2 km from the spa resort of Sandanski. The village has a permanent population of 1150 people (2008).
