= Bozhdovo =

Bozhdovo Бождово Bojduva
- Village
- Location within Bulgaria
- Coordinates: 41°36′N 23°22′E
- Country: Bulgaria
- Province: Blagoevgrad Province
- Municipality: Sandanski Municipality
- Time zone: UTC+2 (EET)
  - Summer (DST): UTC+3 (EEST)

Bozhdovo (Bulgarian: Бождово; Aromanian: Bojduva) is a village in Sandanski Municipality, in Blagoevgrad Province, Bulgaria. Some Aromanian nomadic families settled here in the 19th century.
