= Malki Tsalim =

- Village
- Location within Bulgaria
- Coordinates: 41°36′N 23°21′E
- Country: Bulgaria
- Province: Blagoevgrad Province
- Municipality: Sandanski
- Time zone: UTC+2 (EET)
  - Summer (DST): UTC+3 (EEST)

Malki Tsalim is a village in the municipality of Sandanski, in Blagoevgrad Province, Bulgaria.

== Geography ==
The village borders the other villages Golyam Tsalim and Bozhdovo. The houses within the village are built according to the Rhodope house architecture standard and 10 of them are part of the cultural heritage.

== History ==
The church of St. Dimitar is built in the second half of the 19 century.

In the "Ethnography of the vilayets of Adrianople, Monastir and Thessaloniki", published in Constantinople in 1878 and reflecting the population statistics of 1873, Timar Tsalipe is indicated as a village with 30 households and 110 Bulgarians, and Vakf Kalip with 45 households and 150 Bulgarians.

In 1891 Georgi Strezov writes about the village " Malki Tzalim, 1/4 hr E from Golemi Tzalim. The same locality and the same livelihood as in the village above. Mixed Church; there is no school. 30 houses only Bulgarians. "

By 1900, according to Vasil Kanchov's statistics ("Macedonia. Ethnography and Statistics"), the population of Vakai Tsalim was 210 people, all Bulgarian-Christians, and Timara Tsalim was 185 people, all Bulgarian-Christians.

In 2019 a chapel with patron saint St. great-martyr Mina is built where a festival is held annually on 11 November.

== Cultural and natural attractions ==
Near the village there is a cave-church "Saint John of Rila". Legend has it that the saint lived there before he was expelled by the local population, who considered him a sorcerer. Every year on August 18, at this place, the villages of Golyam and Malak Tsalim make a Kurban, at which there are many songs, dances and family meetings are held.

== Famous and important people ==
=== Born ===
- Bozhin Velev (1896-1923) - Bulgarian politician from BZNS
- Iliya Petrov (1935 - 1999) - Foreman and community worker
