= Yanovo =

- Village
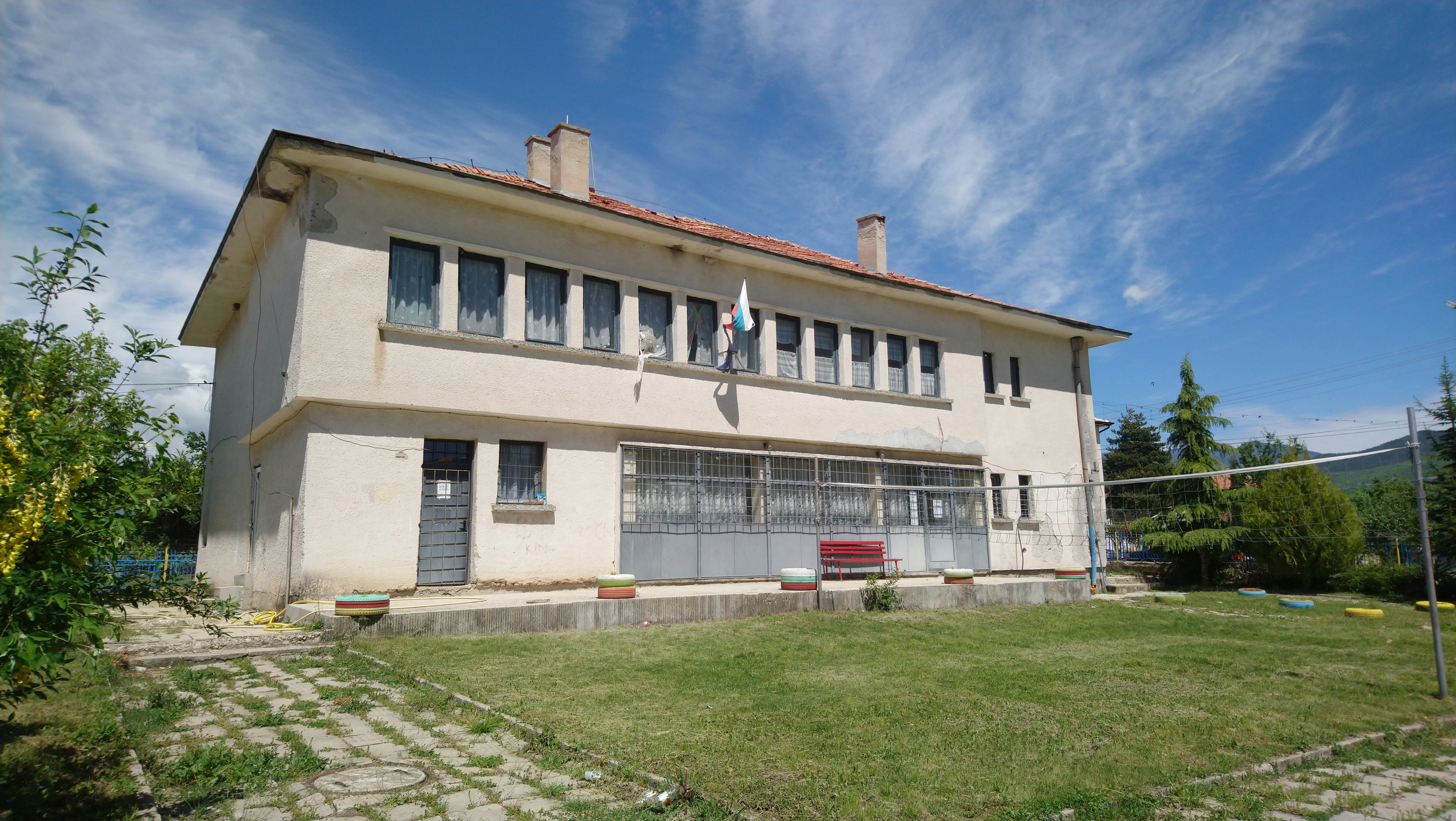
- Mayor's office

- Location within Bulgaria
- Coordinates: 41°26′N 23°29′E
- Country: Bulgaria
- Province: Blagoevgrad Province
- Municipality: Sandanski
- Time zone: UTC+2 (EET)
  - Summer (DST): UTC+3 (EEST)

Yanovo is a village in the municipality of Sandanski, in Blagoevgrad Province, Bulgaria. It is located 5km away from Katuntsi and 30km away from Sandanski.
