= Rozhen Monastery =

Monastery in Bulgaria

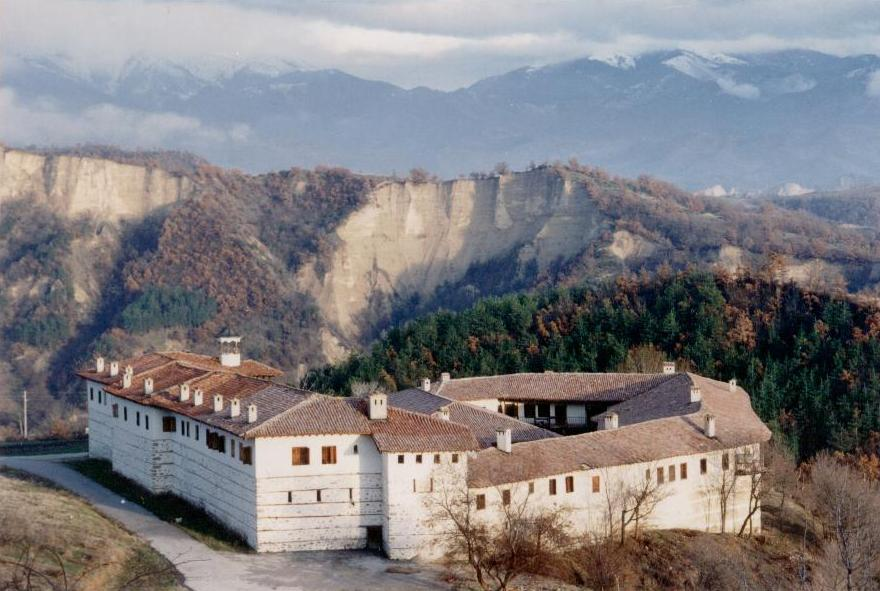
- A view to the monastery

- Location within Bulgaria

Monastery information
- Established: 13th century

Site
- Location: Rozhen, Bulgaria, Sandanski Municipality, Blagoevgrad Province
- Coordinates: 41°31′49.77″N 23°25′35.24″E
- Public access: yes

The Rozhen Monastery of the Nativity of the Mother of God (Bulgarian: Роженски манастир "Рождество Богородично", Rozhenski manastir "Rozhdestvo Bogorodichno", Greek: Μονή Ροζινού, Moni Rozinou) is the biggest monastery in the Pirin Mountains in southwestern Bulgaria, nestled in the Melnik Earth Pyramids. It is one of the few medieval Bulgarian monasteries well preserved until today.

The earliest archaeological evidence of medieval life at the place is a grave with a few coins and decorations from the time of Byzantine Emperor Michael VIII Palaiologos (1259–1282). Some other items also date to the 13th century while the marble frieze above the central gate of the church dates to the 13th or 14th century. A couple of new buildings were constructed in the monastery at the time of Despot Alexius Slav. The earliest written source testifying to the monastery's existence is a note on a chant book from 1551, today in the Great Lavra library on Mount Athos.

The monastery church was built before the 15th century and painted in 1597; some of those frescoes are preserved. In 1611, the south facade was painted. The Rozhen Monastery was devastated by fire between 1662 and 1674, destroying the library and severely damaging most buildings. The monastery was restored over the next century with the financial help of rich Bulgarians from the whole country. The reconstruction began in 1715 and was fully finished in 1732.

The monastery reached its apogee in the 19th century, when it was a regional centre of Orthodox Christianity and owned a lot of land in the area. Famous Bulgarian revolutionary Yane Sandanski's grave is located near the monastery.

== Honour ==
Rozhen Peninsula on Livingston Island in the South Shetland Islands, Antarctica is named after Rozhen site in relation with the Rozhen Monastery.

== Gallery ==
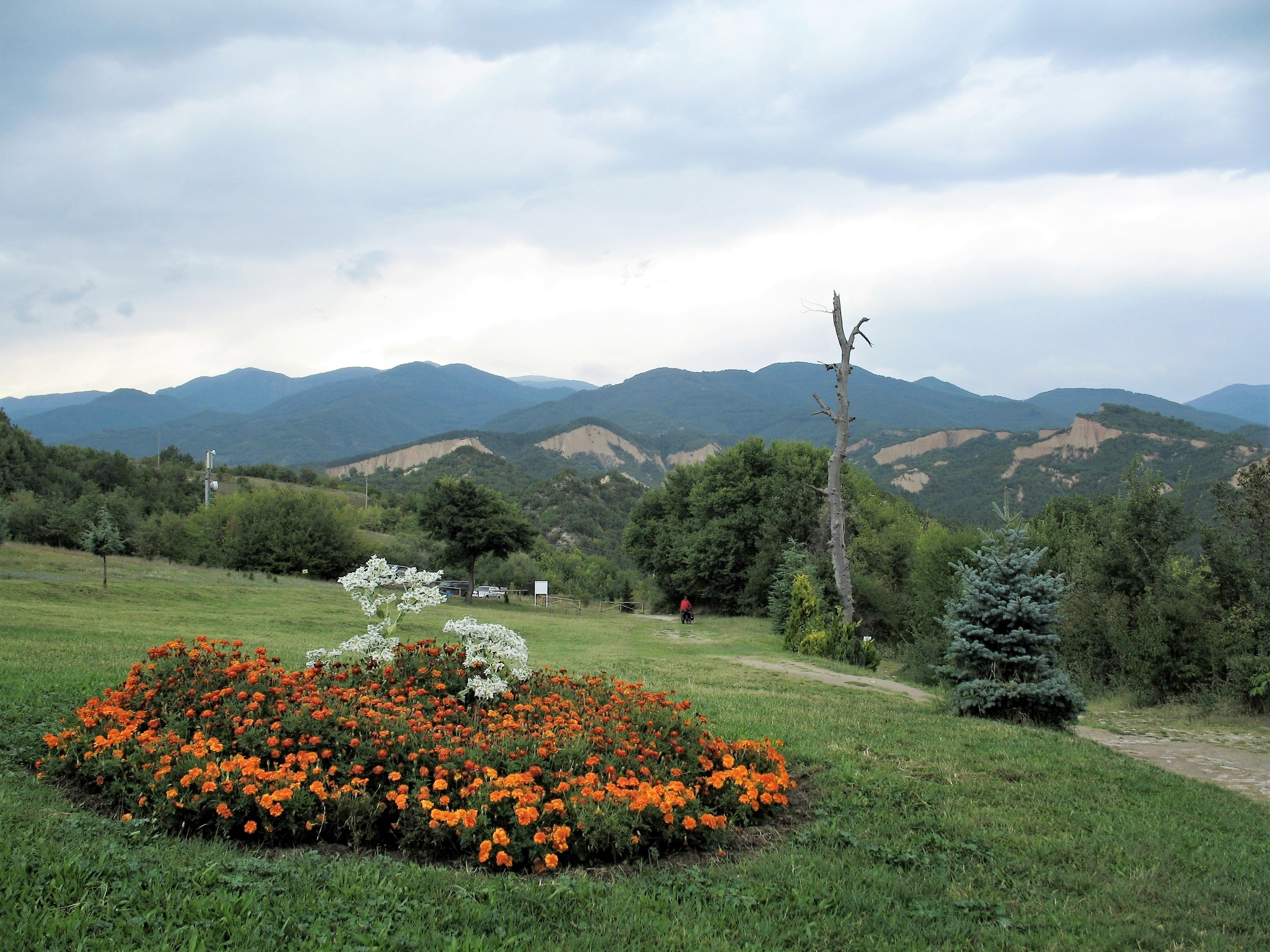
Monastery garden

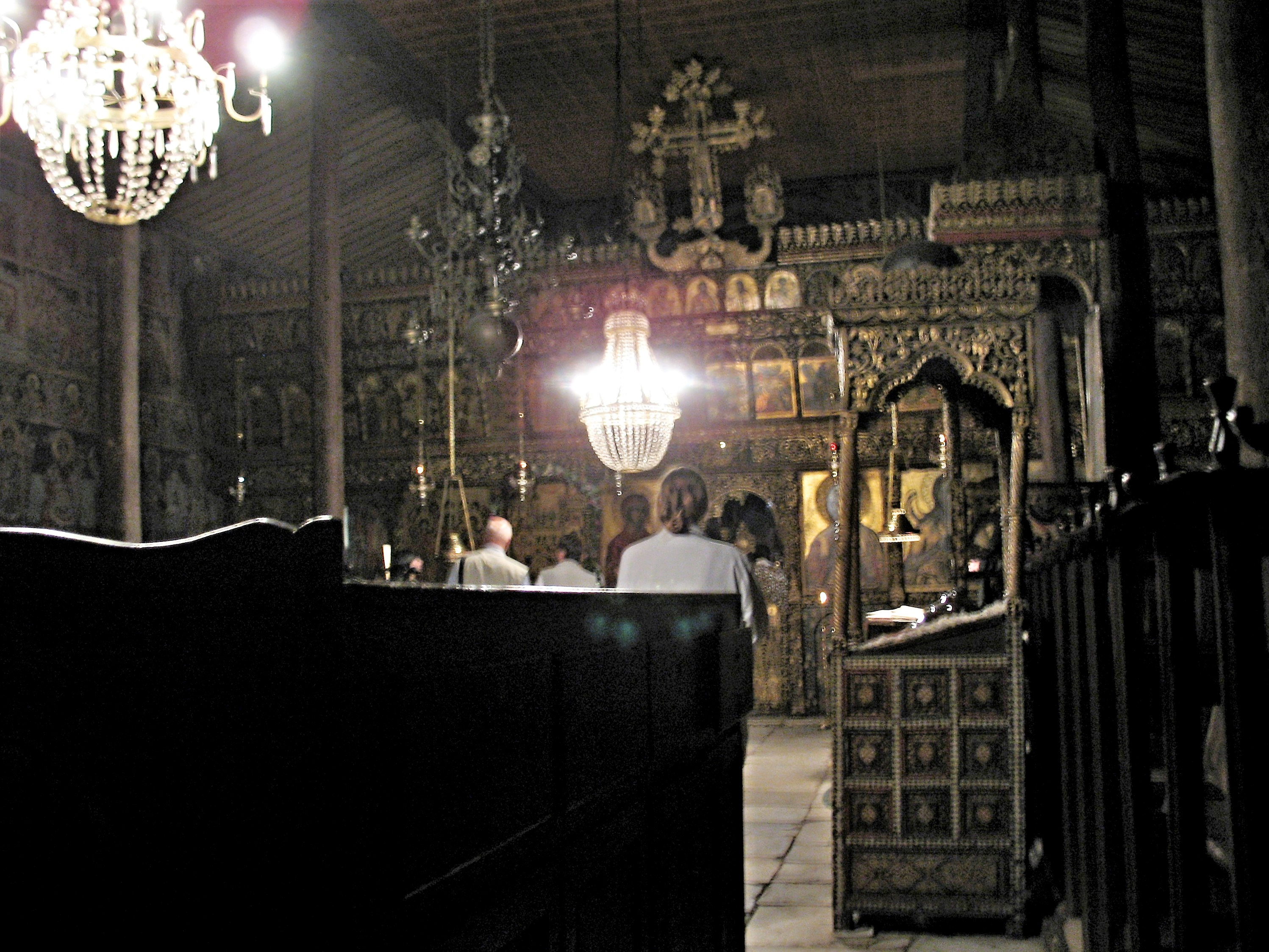
Morning Worship

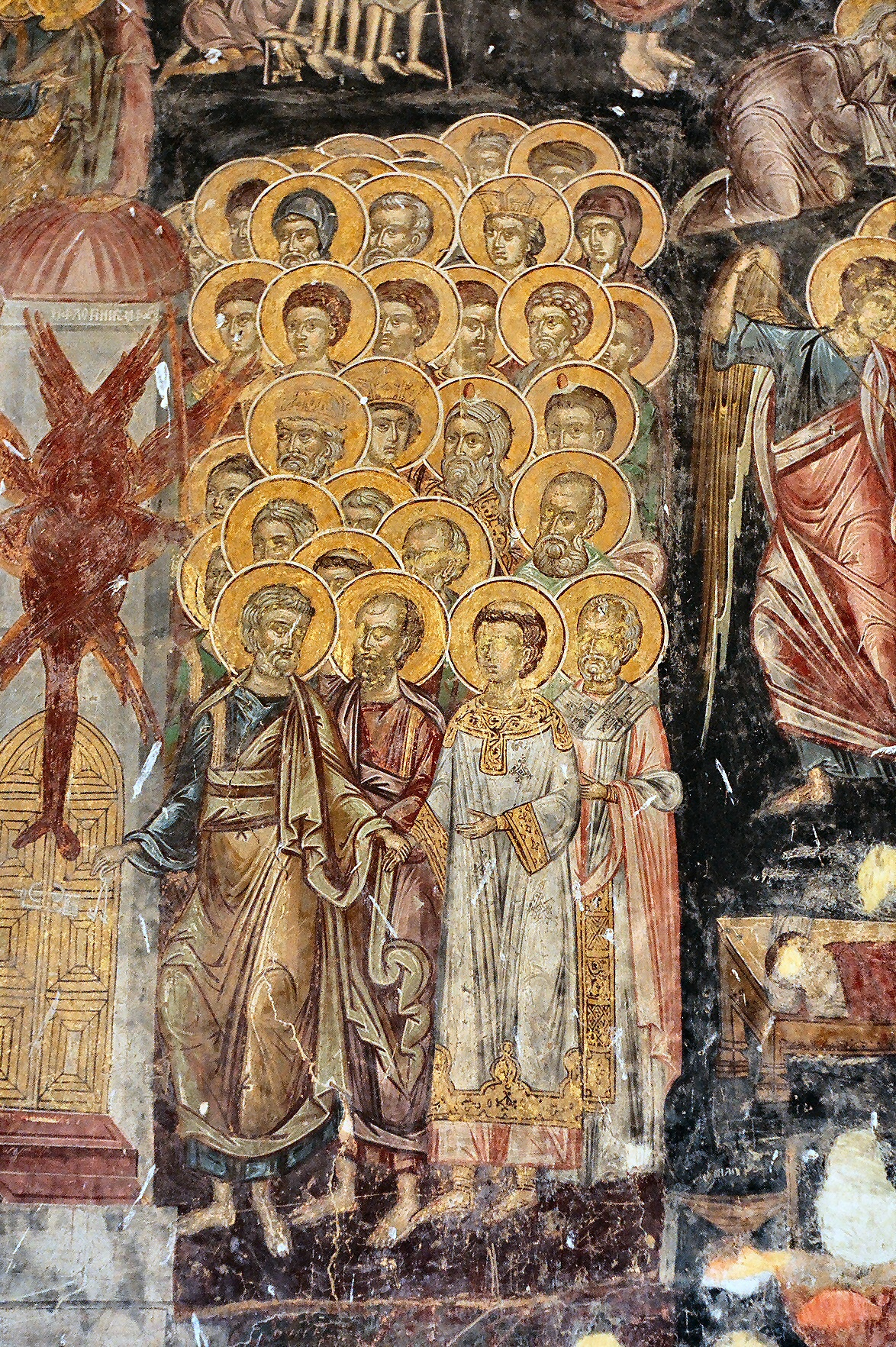
A fresco in the Rozhen Monastery

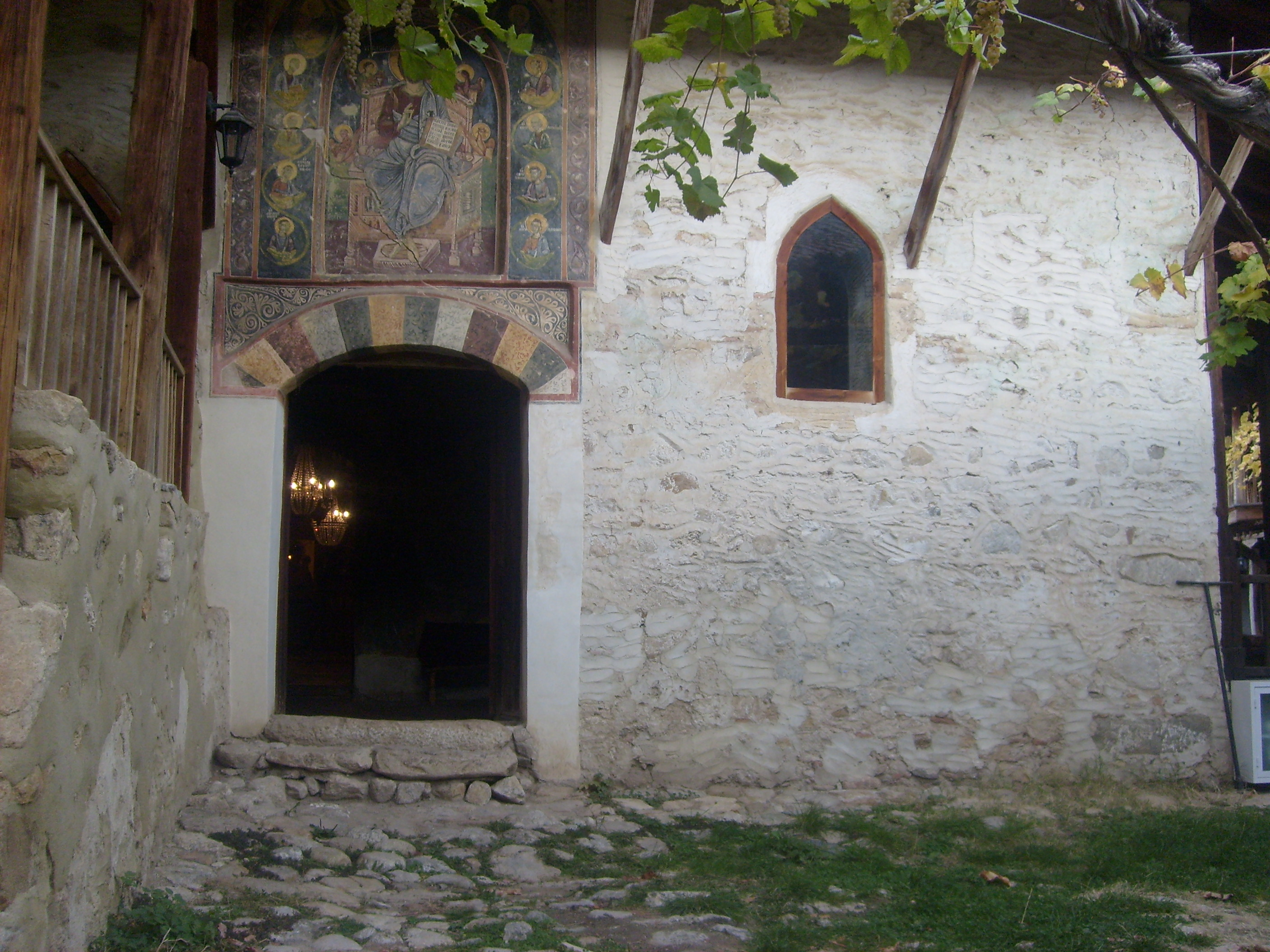
Entrance to the monastery church

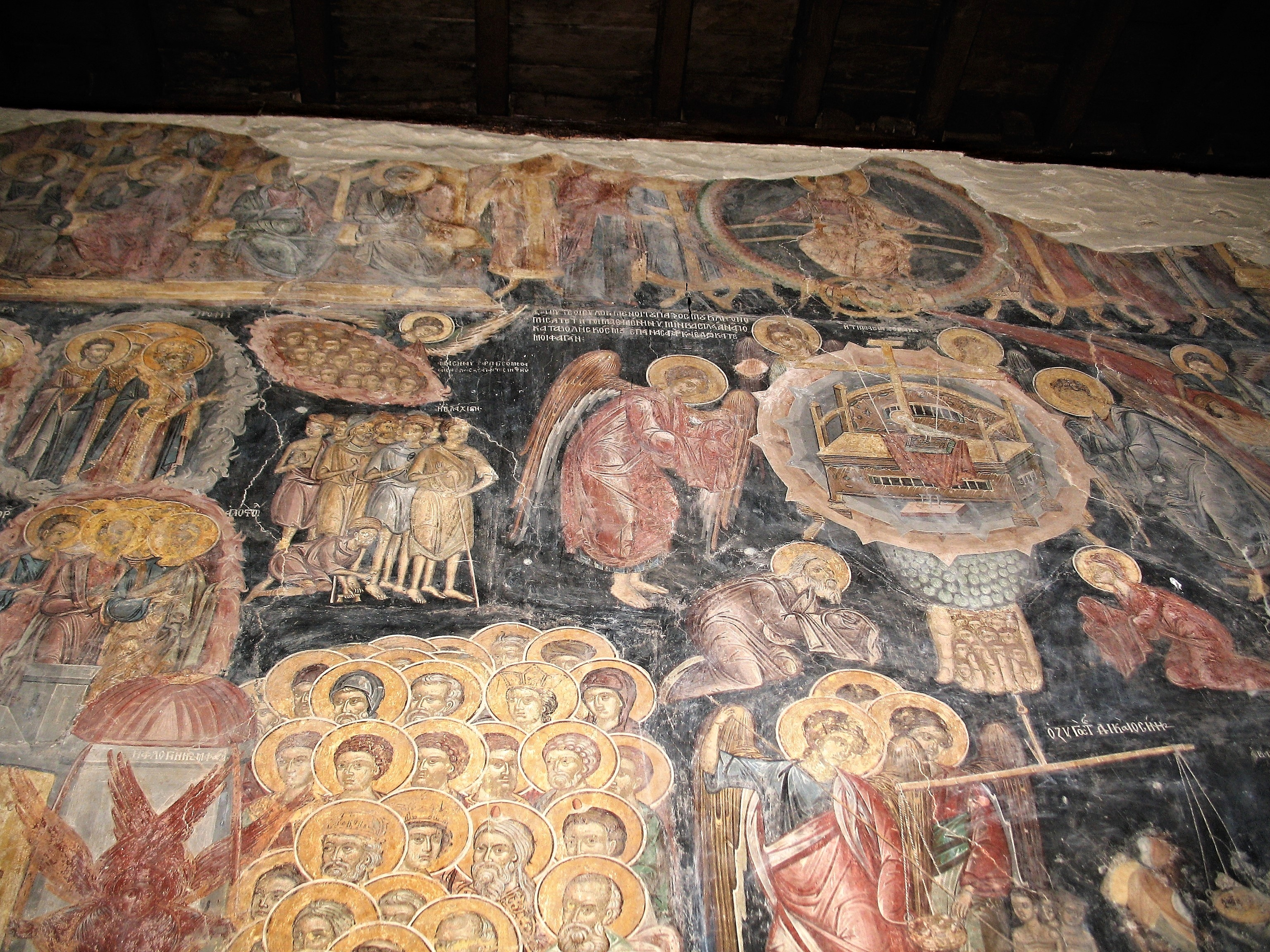
External frescoes of the church

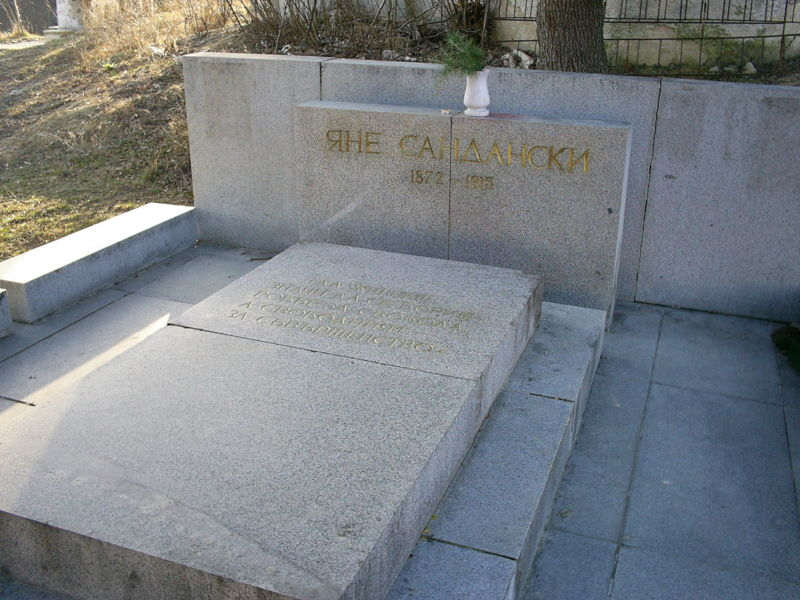
Grave of Yane Sandanski
