= Rozhen, Bulgaria =

- Village
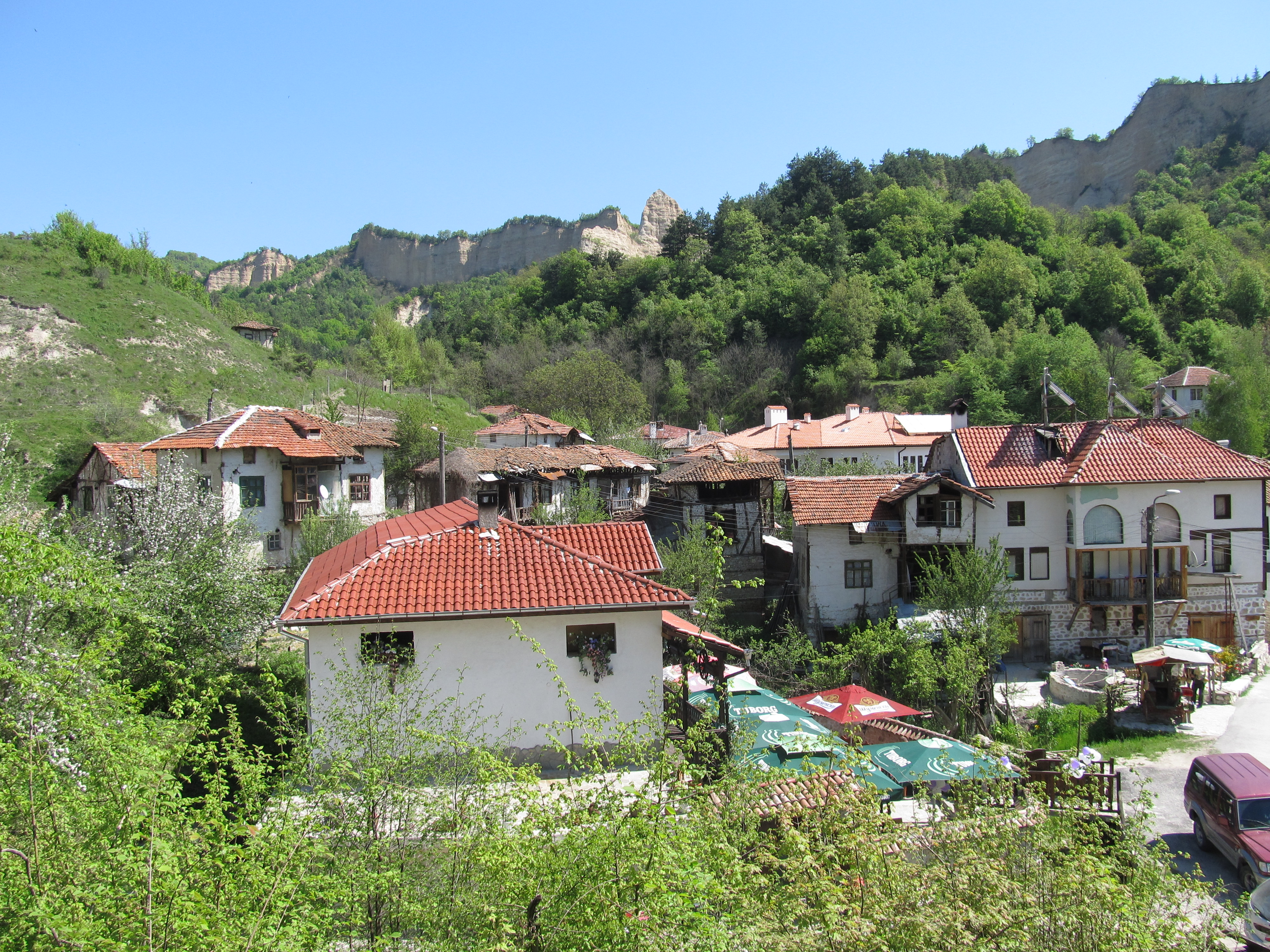

- Location within Bulgaria
- Coordinates: 41°32′N 23°26′E
- Country: Bulgaria
- Province: Blagoevgrad Province
- Municipality: Sandanski
- Time zone: UTC+2 (EET)
  - Summer (DST): UTC+3 (EEST)

Rozhen, Bulgaria (Bulgarian: Рожен [ˈrɔʒɛn]) is a village in the municipality of Sandanski, in Blagoevgrad Province, Bulgaria. It is situated at the south-western foothills of the Pirin mountain range and is nestled within the Melnik Earth Pyramids. In its outskirts is located the Rozhen Monastery, the largest one in Pirin. The Greek name of the village is "Ροζινός" (Rozinos).
