= Belyovo =

- Village
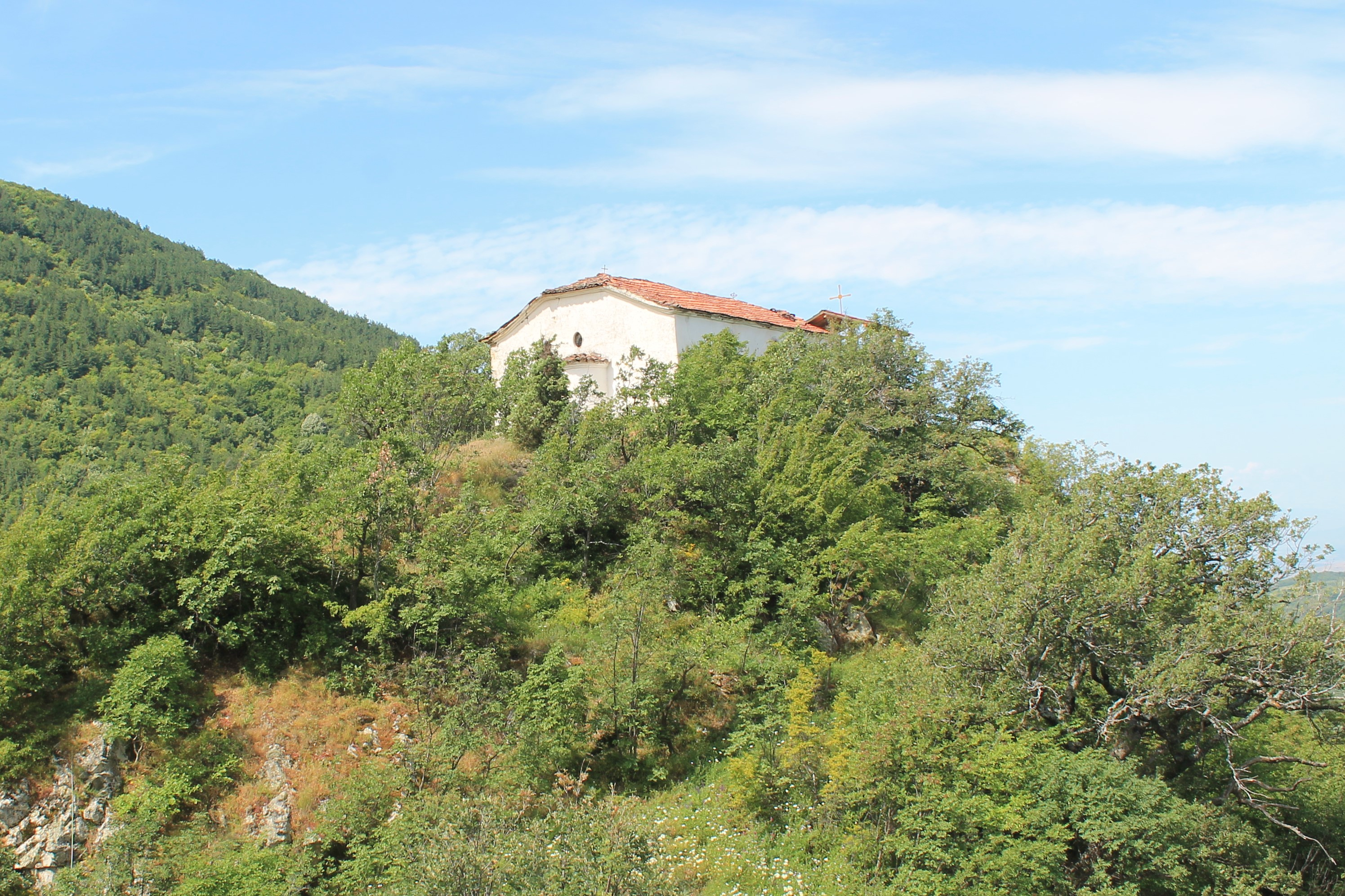

- Location within Bulgaria
- Coordinates: 41.4833°N 23.5500°E
- Country: Bulgaria
- Province: Blagoevgrad Province
- Municipality: Sandanski Municipality
- Time zone: UTC+2 (EET)
  - Summer (DST): UTC+3 (EEST)

Belyovo is a village in Sandanski Municipality, in Blagoevgrad Province, Bulgaria.
