= Hotovo =

- Village
- Location within Bulgaria
- Coordinates: 41.5000°N 23.3333°E
- Country: Bulgaria
- Province: Blagoevgrad Province
- Municipality: Sandanski
- Time zone: UTC+2 (EET)
  - Summer (DST): UTC+3 (EEST)

Hotovo is a village in the municipality of Sandanski, in Blagoevgrad Province, Bulgaria.
