= Doleni =

Doleni Долени
- Village
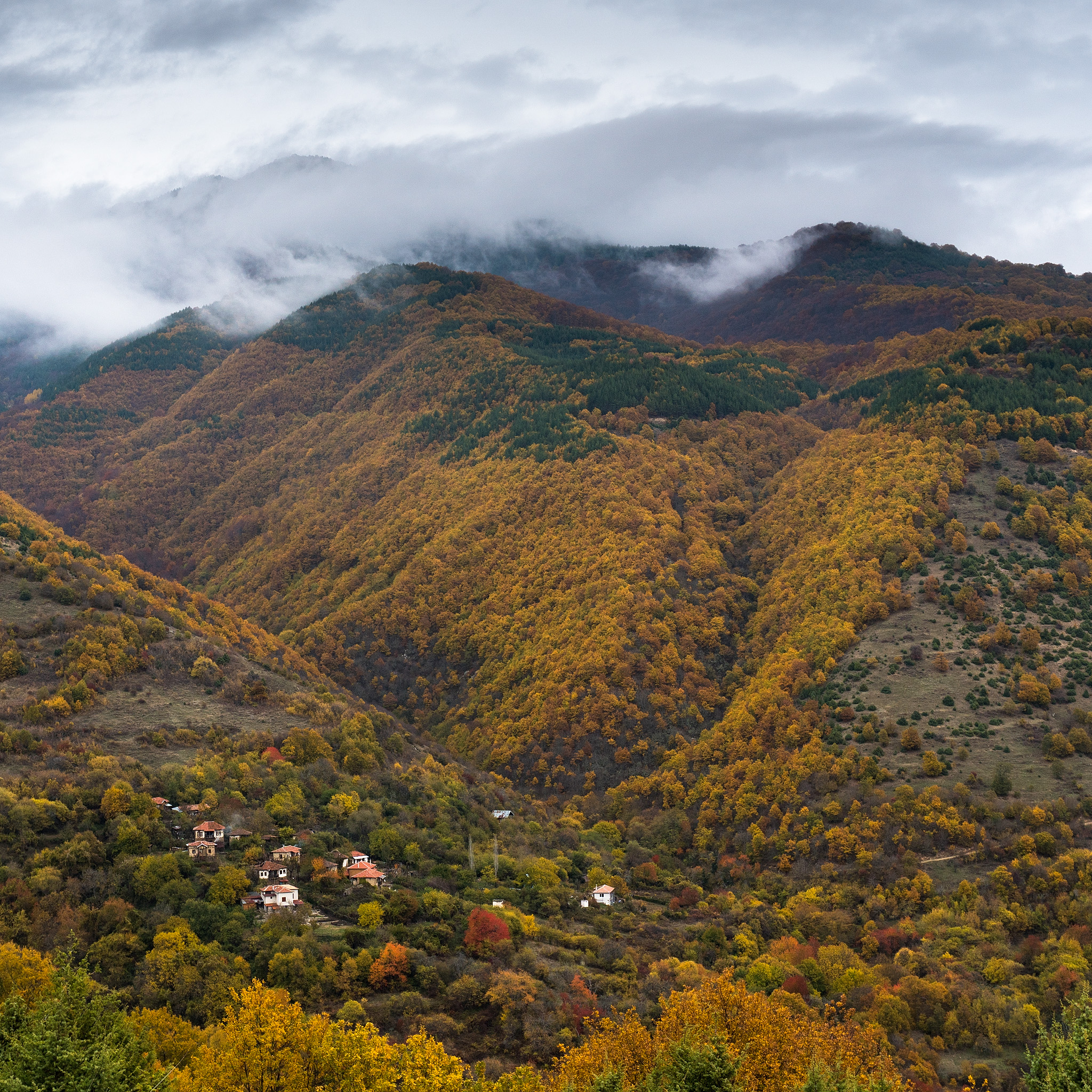

- Location within Bulgaria
- Coordinates: 41°34′18″N 23°24′47″E
- Country: Bulgaria
- Province: Blagoevgrad Province
- Municipality: Sandanski

Area
  - Total: 10.176 km^{2} (3.929 sq mi)
- Elevation: 796 m (2,612 ft)

Population (2013)
  - Total: 3
- Time zone: UTC+2 (EET)
  - Summer (DST): UTC+3 (EEST)
- Postal code: 2811

Doleni (Bulgarian: Долени) is a village in the municipality of Sandanski, in Blagoevgrad Province, south-western Bulgaria and as of 2013 has only 3 inhabitants. It is situated at the south-western foothills of the Pirin mountains a few kilometres north of the Melnik Earth Pyramids. Further north is located Pirin National Park, a UNESCO World Heritage Site. Doleni lies some 124 km south of the national capital Sofia.

In the Middle Ages the village was part of the Bulgarian Empire. In the 14th century Rila Charter of Emperor Ivan Shishman (r. 1371–1395) it was listed as a possession of the Rila Monastery. The village church of Saint Petka was constructed in the 19th century. In 1873 it had 35 households and 120 inhabitants, all of them Bulgarians. At the outbreak of the First Balkan War in 1912 two people from Doleni joined the Macedonian-Adrianopolitan Volunteer Corps that was formed in support the Bulgarian war effort against the Ottoman Empire.
