= Levunovo =

- Village
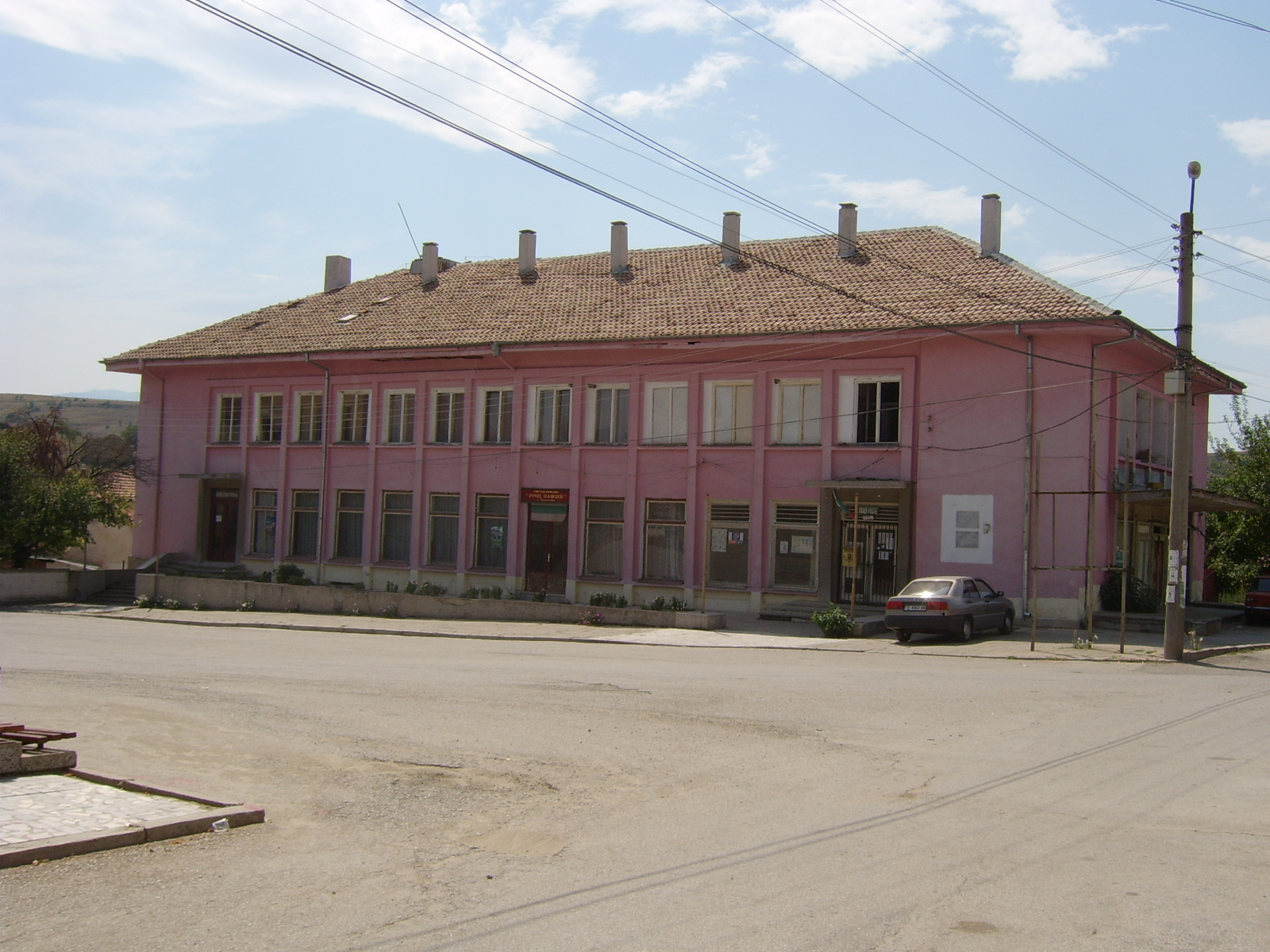
- Chitalishte "Otets Paisiy" in the village of Levunovo. The building houses the post office and the library.

- Location within Bulgaria
- Coordinates: 41°29′N 23°18′E
- Country: Bulgaria
- Province: Blagoevgrad Province
- Municipality: Sandanski
- Time zone: UTC+2 (EET)
  - Summer (DST): UTC+3 (EEST)

Levunovo is a village in the municipality of Sandanski, in Blagoevgrad Province, Bulgaria. A notable citizen of the village is Metodi Mirazchiiski.
