= Ploski, Bulgaria =

Ploski Плocки
- Village
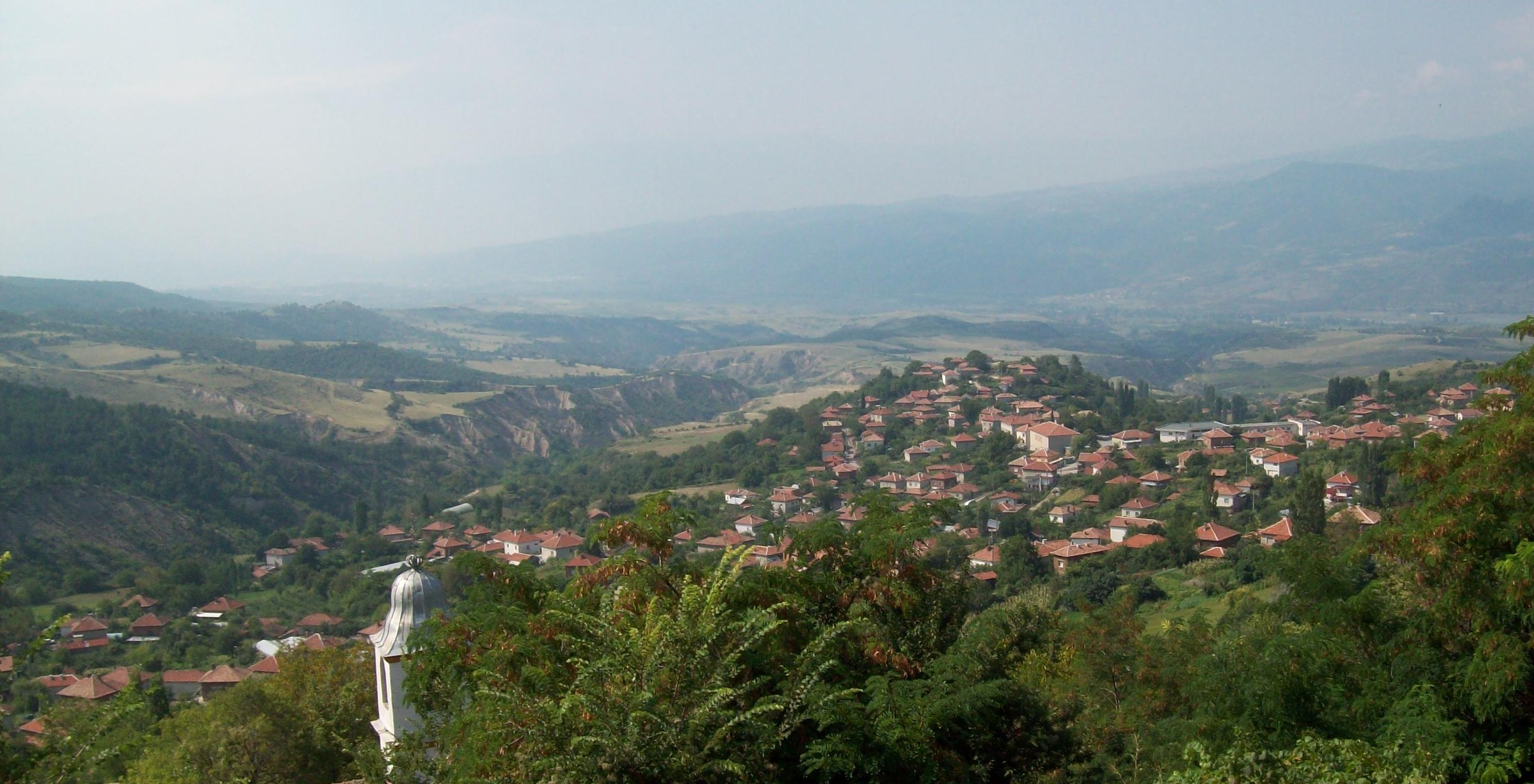

- Location within Bulgaria
- Coordinates: 41°39′N 23°16′E
- Country: Bulgaria
- Province: Blagoevgrad Province
- Municipality: Sandanski
- Time zone: UTC+2 (EET)
  - Summer (DST): UTC+3 (EEST)

Ploski (Bulgarian: Плocки) is a village in the municipality of Sandanski, in Blagoevgrad Province, Bulgaria. It is situated to the West of the Pirin mountain, 17km away from the town of [Sandanski]. The village sits 500-699m above sea level and has a population of 695.

There are remains from Thracian, Roman and Middle Ages. The village of Ploski has an elementary school, a community center, a church, a football stadium and several shops. The church Svetoto Uspenie Bogorodichno is built at the higher part of the village.
