= Zornitsa, Blagoevgrad Province =

Zornitsa
- Village
- Location in Bulgaria
- Coordinates: 41.488°N 23.367°E
- Country: Bulgaria
- Province: Blagoevgrad Province
- Municipality: Sandanski
- Time zone: UTC+2 (EET)
  - Summer (DST): UTC+3 (EEST)

Zornitsa is a village in the municipality of Sandanski, in Blagoevgrad Province, Bulgaria.
