= Kalimantsi, Blagoevgrad Province =

Village in Sandanski, Bulgaria

Coordinates: 41°27′34″N 023°28′35″E

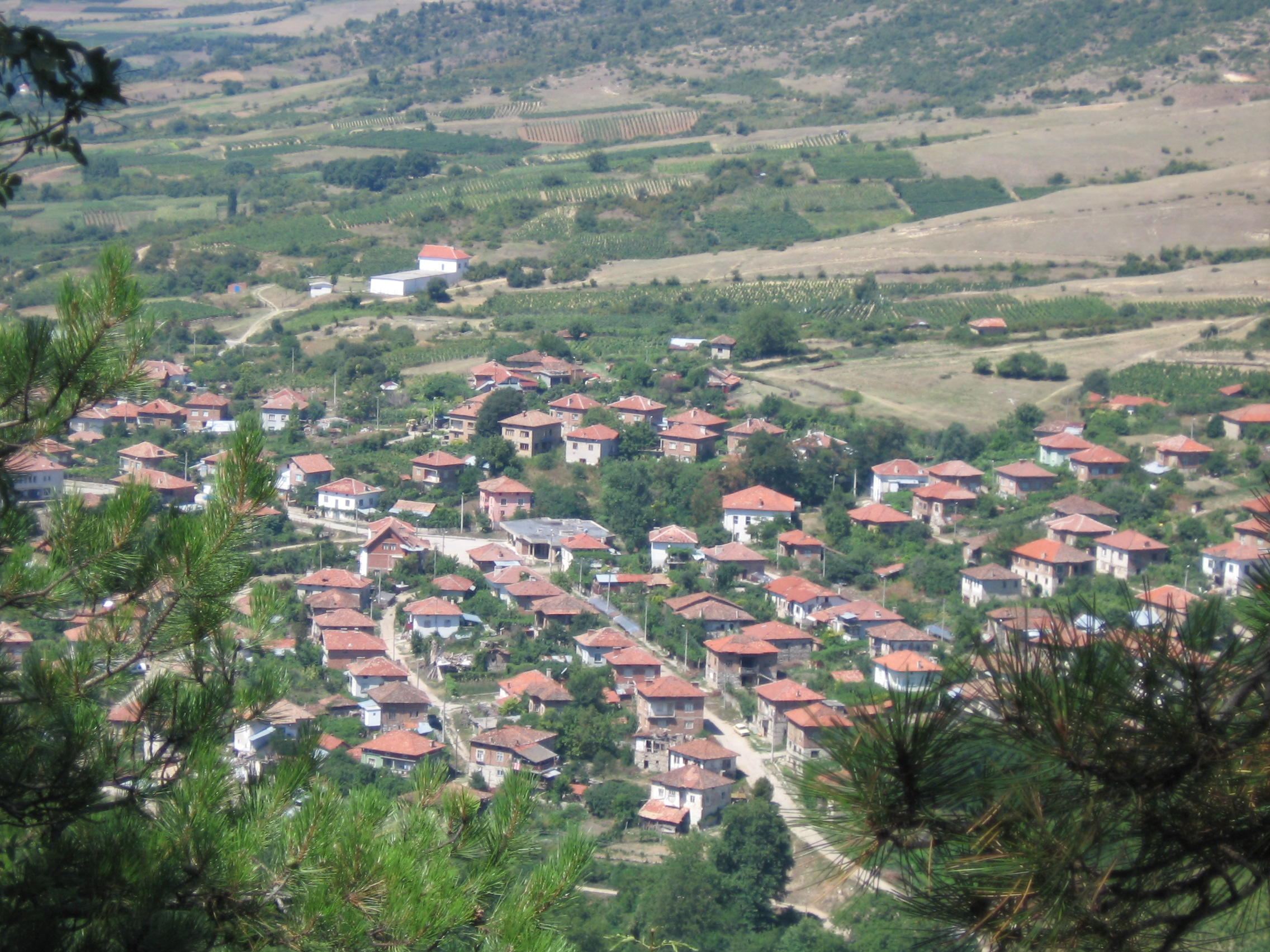
A view over Kalimantsi.

Kalimantsi (also spelled Kalimantzi or Kalimanci, or Bulgarian: Калиманци) is a village in southwestern Bulgaria. It is located in the municipality of Sandanski in the Blagoevgrad Province.
