= Harsovo, Blagoevgrad Province =

Harsovo
- Village
- Location in Bulgaria
- Coordinates: 41.461°N 23.383°E
- Country: Bulgaria
- Province: Blagoevgrad Province
- Municipality: Sandanski
- Time zone: UTC+2 (EET)
  - Summer (DST): UTC+3 (EEST)

Harsovo is a village in the municipality of Sandanski, in Blagoevgrad Province, Bulgaria.
