= Sklave =

Sklave Склаве
- Village
- Location within Bulgaria
- Coordinates: 41°31′N 23°19′E
- Country: Bulgaria
- Province: Blagoevgrad Province
- Municipality: Sandanski
- Time zone: UTC+2 (EET)
  - Summer (DST): UTC+3 (EEST)

Sklave is a village in the municipality of Sandanski, in Blagoevgrad Province, Bulgaria. The name of the village originates from the Latin word Sclavus, meanining a slave. A slave market was situated in the village in Ancient times. A traditional fair still takes place in the village during these days, with farm animals mainly traded. Here the gladiator Spartacus was traded to the Roman empire. The village is also Spartacus's hometown.
