= Roupel Pass =

Coordinates: 41.312°N 23.340°E

The Roupel Gorge or Roupel Pass (Greek: Στενωπός του Ρούπελ; Bulgarian: Рупелски пролом) is a steep river valley in the northern part of Central Macedonia, immediately south of the Greek-Bulgarian border. It was formed by the Strymon River, which stems from the Vitosha mountains and flows into the Aegean Sea. The gorge is rich in biodiversity which may be endangered by the project to build the Motorway 25 which is a part of European route E79. Strymon enters from Bulgaria into Greece west of village Promachonas, going through Roupel Pass, that it opened up, between the mountains Belasica and Orvilos. Here the ground gets flatter so the Strymon loses speed and splits into two branches. The western branch goes to lake Kerkini and then flows southeast where it rejoins the eastern branch near to the village of Lithotopos.

The pass was fortified in 1914–1916, and the Roupel Fortress played a major role in World War I events in Greece and in the German invasion of Greece in 1941.
