= Sandanski Municipality =

Coordinates: 41.5733°N 23.2773°E

Sandanski Municipality Община Сандански
- Municipality
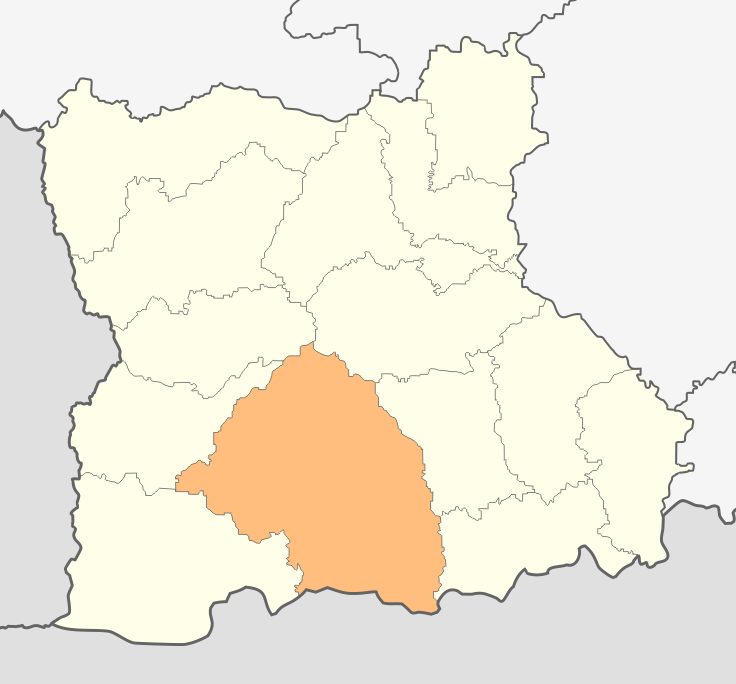
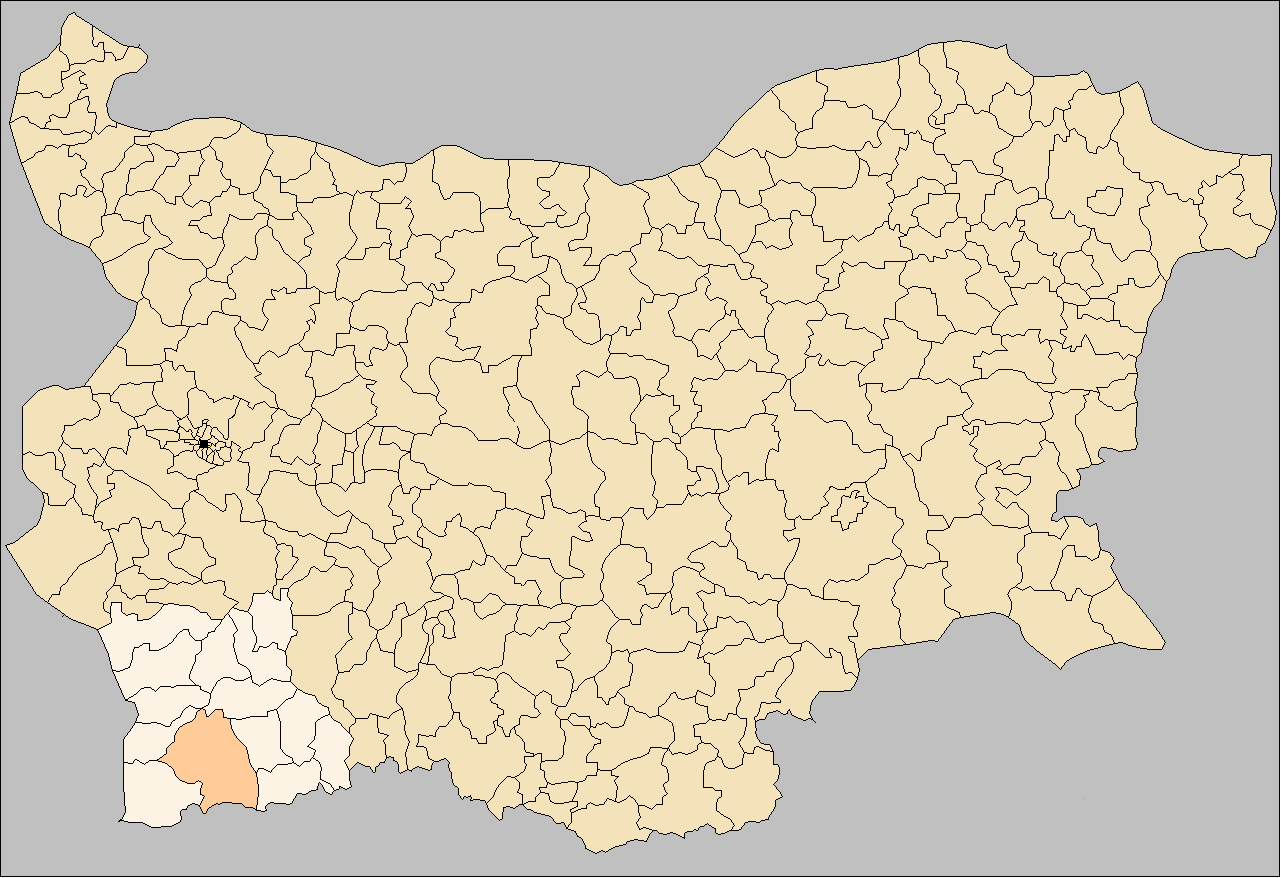
- Location in Blagoevgrad province Location on map of Bulgaria
- Country: Bulgaria
- Province (Oblast): Blagoevgrad

Area
  - Total: 998.416 km^{2} (385.491 sq mi)

Population
  - Total: 41,606
  - Density: 41.672/km^{2} (107.93/sq mi)

Sandanski Municipality is a municipality in Blagoevgrad Province in Southwestern Bulgaria.

== Demographics ==
=== Religion ===
According to the latest Bulgarian census of 2011, the religious composition, among those who answered the optional question on religious identification, was the following:

Religious composition of Sandanski Municipality
Orthodox Christianity	93.24%
Catholicism	0.37%
Protestantism	0.64%
Islam	0.48%
No religion	1.41%
Prefer not to answer, others and indefinable	3.86%
