= Belasitsa Nature Park =

Park in Southwest Bulgaria

Belasitsa Nature park
- IUCN category V (protected landscape/seascape)
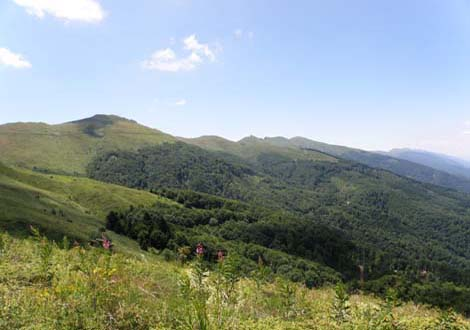
- Belasitsa Mountain

- Location within Bulgaria Location within Greece Location within North Macedonia
- Interactive map of Belasitsa Nature park
- Location: Petrich Municipality, Blagoevgrad Province, Bulgaria
- Nearest city: Petrich
- Coordinates: 41°22′12.4″N 23°11′12.2″E
- Area: 117 km^{2} (45 sq mi)
- Established: 2007

Belasitsa Nature Park (Bulgarian: Беласица Природен Парк) covers the northern slopes of Belasitsa Mountain in the Southwest Region of Bulgaria. The total area of the park is approximately 117 km^{2} (45 sq mi). Belasitsa is designated as part of the European ecological network NATURA 2000 and is managed by the Belasitsa Nature Park Directorate which is a legal entity under the authority of the Executive Forest Agency of Ministry of Agriculture and Food. The Directorate office is located in the village of Kolarovo.

The nature park is bordered to the west by North Macedonia and to the south by Greece, both of which contain regions of Belasitsa Mountain. Belasitsa Nature Park includes the villages of Gabrene, Skrut, Klyuch, Yavornitsa, Kamena, Samuilovo, Kolarovo, Belasitsa, and Petrich, all located in the municipality of Petrich, Blagoevgrad Province.

== History ==
The initial process to conserve biodiversity in Belasitsa Mountain started in 1988 with the creation of the Kongur Reserve. It was declared by Order 671 of the Committee for Environmental Protection of 06.15.1988. The purpose of the order was to protect natural forest ecosystems of common chestnut and beech trees.

At the base of the mountain lies Topilishte protected area, declared by Order 328 of 05.08.1992. The order was designed to protect Royal and Majestic Fern.

Belasitsa was named to the Order RD-925 from 12.27.2007 of the Minister of Environment and Water in Bulgaria and is the newest nature park in the country.

== Flora ==
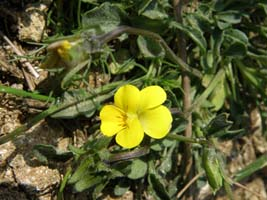
Viola stojanowii

Around 1200 plant species have been found in Belasitsa Nature Park. This includes Bulgarian and Balkan endemites, species protected by the Law on Biological Diversity, species included in the Convention on International Trade in Endangered Species of Wild Fauna and Flora, and species included in the Red Book of Bulgaria.

Some of the plant species protected in the forest include common beech, common chestnut (largest deposit in the country), common yew, European holly, Heldreich's maple, Albanian lily, and Medicago carstiensis.

== Fauna ==
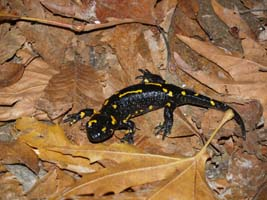
Salamandra salamandra

The fauna in Belasitsa are affected by two main attributes of the mountain: location and altitude. Belasitsa Mountain is in the southwesternmost part of Bulgaria and is part of the Northend zone of the subtropical area.

In Belasitsa's short history around 1500 species of invertebrates and approximately 180 species of vertebrates have been discovered in the mountain including Bulgarian and Balkan endemytes. Some of the protected animals are white-backed woodpecker, black woodpecker, Orpheus warbler, and small olive tree Warbler.

== Resources ==
- The Nature Parks of Bulgaria Itineraries, State Forestry Agency, Bulgaria
- Защитените Територии В Благоевград Област, Регионална Инспекция по Околната Среда И Водите Благоевград
- Protected Territories in the Blagoevgrad District, Regional Inspectorate of Environment and Water, Blagoevgrad
