= Ano Poroia =

Ano Porroia Άνω Πορρόια
- Community
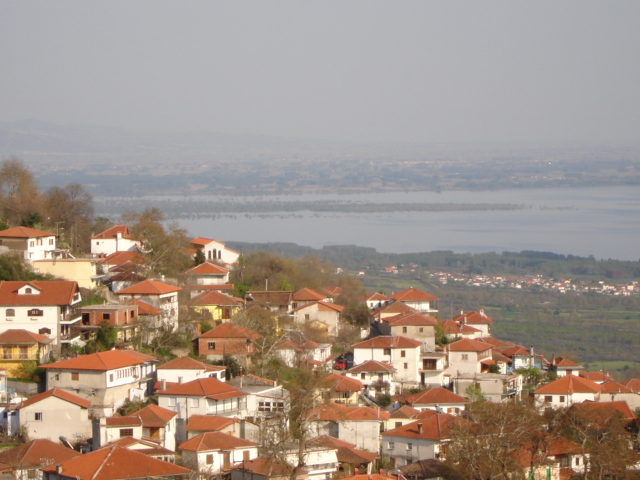
- The east side of the village

- Location within Greece
- Coordinates: 41°17′N 23°02′E
- Country: Greece
- Administrative region: Central Macedonia
- Regional unit: Serres
- Municipality: Sintiki
- Municipal unit: Kerkini
- Elevation: 380 m (1,250 ft)

Population (2021)
  - Community: 836
- Time zone: UTC+2 (EET)
  - Summer (DST): UTC+3 (EEST)
- Postal code: 620 55
- Area code: 23270
- Vehicle registration: ΕΡ
- Website: https://www.sintiki.gov.gr/

Ano Poroia (Greek: Άνω Πορόια) is a village in Greece, located in Macedonia. The population was 836 (2021).

== Geography ==
The village is located 55 km and 30 km respectively to the Northwest of the town of Serres and to the west of Sidirokastro. It is at the foot of the Belles (Belasitsa) at an altitude of 380 m. Lake Kerkini is to the south of Ano Poroia.

== Name ==
The town of Ano Poroia, (translated as 'Upper Poroia') is known in Aromanian as Foroi or Poroya di-Nsus. It was known as "Poroj" during Ottoman rule. The modern name of the settlement is in Bulgarian: Горни Порой. This is to differentiate it from the 'Lower Poroia' settlement one kilometer to the west.

== History ==
During the 19th century the village was one of the largest and developed in Demirhisar Kaza of the Serres Sandjak. The main occupation was farming (tobacco, flax, cotton, barley, rye), sericulture, and commerce. The population was composed of Greeks, Aromanians, Bulgarians and Turks.

In "Ethnographie des vilayets d'Adrianople, de Monastir et de Salonique" (issued in Constantinople in 1878 and concerning the population) it was written that Gorni Poroi was a village, and had 320 households with 1,000 Bulgarians and 60 Aromanians. Gustav Weigand — German linguist and specialist in Balkan languages (esp. Bulgarian and Aromanian) — passed during the early 20th century. He mentions 750 households. 450 of them Bulgarian, 200 Aromanian and 100 Turkish.

At first both Bulgarians and Aromanians adhered the same liturgy and they belonged to a unified church that was serving in Greek.

The oldest school that ever existed in the village is mentioned in 1819. It was a Greek elementary school that was attended by Aromanians and a few Bulgarian children of the wealthier class. The first conflict between Greeks and Bulgarians was registered in 1883, when Bulgarians tried and achieved to separate from the Greek church and education and regenerate their own. According to Vasil Kanchov, in 1891 the village had two Bulgarian churches (serving in Church-Slavonic) and an Aromanian church (serving in Greek). There were two Bulgarian elementary schools, and one Greek elementary school that was attended by Aromanians. According to Kantchov, there were 3,780 people living in the village around 1900. 2,200 of them were Bulgarian, 480 were Turkish, and 1,100 Aromanian.

In 1891 Georgi Strezov wrote about the village:

Gorni Poroy, a large village at the foot of Belasitsa. It is a 12 hour voyage NW from Serres. The houses are densely built, so they look like they are stacked on top of each other. This village, as well as Dolni Poroy suffer from frequent torrents, which flow from Belasitsa during heavy rain; hence their names. The earth being stony, the inhabitants indulge in various other occupations; primarily silk, so the village is surrounded by gardens surrounded by mulberries. There are also cattle breeders, tailors, shoemakers, blacksmiths. Tobacco is also sown, mostly flax. The Vlachs [referring to the Aromanians], as is their wont, are aligned to the Greek Orthodox Church; have a church "St. Bogoroditsa ”and “St. Nicholas” and a school with two teachers and 70 students. The Bulgarians are among the most pious: they have a church "St. Georgi” and “St. Dimitar” and a school with 56 students. The village contains 50 Turkish, 350 Bulgarian and 200 Wallachian houses.

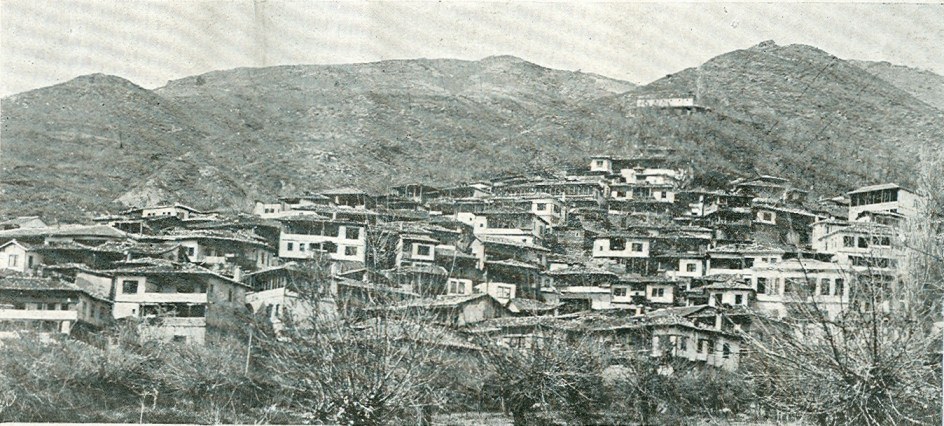
Panoramic photo of Ano Poroia from the beginning of the XX century with Belles in the background

Around the turn of the 20th century, the Bulgarian people in Gorni Poroj were within the borders of the Bulgarian Exarchate. According to Dimitar Mishev, the secretary of the exarchate, in 1905 there were 3,840 Bulgarian exarchatists, 25 ethnic Greeks, and 750 Aromanians. There was a Bulgarian elementary school and a Greek elementary and middle-high school.

The Bulgarian 7th Rila Division controlled the village expelling the Ottoman authorities in October 1912, during the First Balkan War. During the Second Balkan War, on July 9, 1913, the Greek army captured the village.

After the war, the village remained within the borders of Greece. A large portion of the Bulgarian population, as well some Aromanians, emigrated to south Bulgaria. They went primarily to the towns of Petrich, Blagoevgrad, and Plovdiv, and to the villages on the northern slopes of Belasitsa, Belasitsa, Kolarovo, Samuilovo, Klyuch, Skrat. In 1913 according to the Greek statistic ministry there were 2.684 Greek Macedonians in the village (including Aromanians). In the 1920s, Greek refugees from Asia Minor were resettled in the village. It was occupied again by Bulgaria in periods of 1916-1917 and 1941-1944.

== The village ==
The village is located at the foot of Mount Belles, overlooking the valley and Lake Kerkini. The settlement preserves the characteristics of the Macedonian Architecture brought by the Aromanians from Epirus and Western Macedonia along with their customs and traditions, which were "married" perfectly later with the settlement of refugees from Asia Minor in 1922. Sights are the cobbled streets of "mahalades", the aesthetic forest with the plane trees and the hagiographed chapels of Agios Georgios and Agios Dimitrios .

== Tourism ==
The village is suitable for tourism throughout the year. In the area, there are businesses such as restaurants, cafes and hotels. Activities that one can indulge in are hiking, horse riding, mountaineering and 4x4 routes. There are also hiking trails, while mountaineering is supported by the Mountaineering Association of Ano Poroia.

== Notable persons ==
- Dimitrios Itsios (1906–1941), Greek soldier murdered by Nazis

== Notes ==
Web page: https://ano-porroia.gr

== Bibliography ==
- Brankoff, DM [in Bulgarian] (2018) [1905]. La Macedoine et sa Population Chrétienne: Avec deux cartes ethnographiques [Macedonia and its Christian Population] (PDF) (in French). Paris: Librarie Plon, Plon-Nourrit et Cie. ISBN 978-0-36-624171-2. OCLC 581594143.
- Kanchov, Vasil (1996) [1900]. Makedonija : etnografija i statistika [Macedonia: Ethnography and statistics] (in Bulgarian). Sofia: Bulgarian Academy of Sciences. ISBN 978-9-54-430424-9. OCLC 164844115.
- Kusev, Metodiy; Gruev, Georg; et al. (1878). Ethnographie des Vilayets d'Andrinople, de Monastir et de Salonique [Ethnography of the provinces of Adrianople, Monastir and Thessaloniki] (in French). Istanbul: Courrier d'Orient. OCLC 769699229.
- Sinvet, Alexandre (1878). Les Grecs de l'Empire Ottoman. Etude Statistique et Ethnographique [The Greeks of the Ottoman Empire. A Statistical and Ethnographic Study] (in French) (2nd ed.). Istanbul: l'Orient Illustré. OCLC 252032470.
- Stresov, Georgi (1891). Два санджака отъ Источна Македония [Two sanjaks from Eastern Macedonia] (PDF) (in Bulgarian). Sofia: Dŭrzhavna pechatnitsa.
