= Strumeshnitsa =

Strumeshnitsa may refer to:

- Strumeshnitsa (river), a river in Bulgaria and North Macedonia
- Strumeshnitsa, Bulgaria, a village in Bulgaria
