= Samuel's Fortress (disambiguation) =

Samuel's Fortress may refer to:

- Samuel's Fortress, Ohrid, in North Macedonia
- Samuel's Fortress, Klyuch, in Bulgaria
- the village of Samuilova Krepost, Petrich municipality, Blagoevgrad Province, Bulgaria
