= Hristo Andonov =

Bulgarian revolutionary

Voivode Hristo Andonov
- Христо Андонов
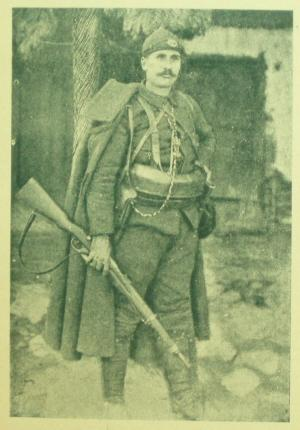
- A photo of Hristo Andonov
- Born: 1887; Grčište, Salonika Vilayet, Ottoman Empire (now Republic of North Macedonia)
- Died: 1928 (aged 40–41); Dimidovo, Adrianople Vilayet, Ottoman Empire (now Samuilovo, Bulgaria)
- Military career
- Allegiance: IMRO; Kingdom of Bulgaria
- Branch: Bulgarian Army
- Unit: Macedonian-Adrianopolitan Volunteer Corps
- Conflicts: Macedonian Struggle; Balkan Wars; First Balkan War; Bulgarian front; Second Balkan War; World War I; Macedonian front

Hristo Andonov (Bulgarian/Macedonian: Христо Андонов) (1887–1928) was a Bulgarian revolutionary and a leader of the Internal Macedonian Revolutionary Organization (IMARO).

== Biography ==
Hristo Andonov was born in the village of Grčište (now in Republic of North Macedonia). He joined the revolutionary organization IMARO, but because he was wanted by the Ottoman authorities, he escaped to Bulgaria. During the Balkan Wars, Andonov was a volunteer in the Macedonian-Adrianopolitan Volunteer Corps in the revolutionary band of Ichko Dimitrov. Later, he was a member of the revolutionary band of Kosta Hristov Popeto and he also served in the 4th company of the 15th Štip Division. At the end of the First World War, he participated in the restoration of the IMRO and joined a revolutionary band that operated in the region of Strumica. 1923 he became a leader in the region of Gevgelija, and in the years that followed, he became a leader of the region of Dojran.

Andonov was killed in 1928 near the village of Dimidovo, in the Petrich region, which was renamed Samuilovo in 1935.
