= Skrat (disambiguation) =

Skrat may refer to:

- Skrat, a mythical creature from Scandinavian folklore
- Skrat, Blagoevgrad Province, a village in Petrich Municipality, Bulgaria

It could also be a misspelling of

- Scrat, a saber-toothed squirrel (fictional species) in the animated movie Ice Age and its sequels
