= Drangovo =

Drangovo may refer to the following villages in Bulgaria:

- Drangovo, Blagoevgrad Province
- Drangovo, Kardzhali Province
- Drangovo, Plovdiv Province, in Brezovo Municipality
