= Kladentsi =

Kladentsi may refer to the following places in Bulgaria:

- Kladentsi, Blagoevgrad Province
- Kladentsi, Dobrich Province
