= Toni Tasev =

Bulgarian footballer

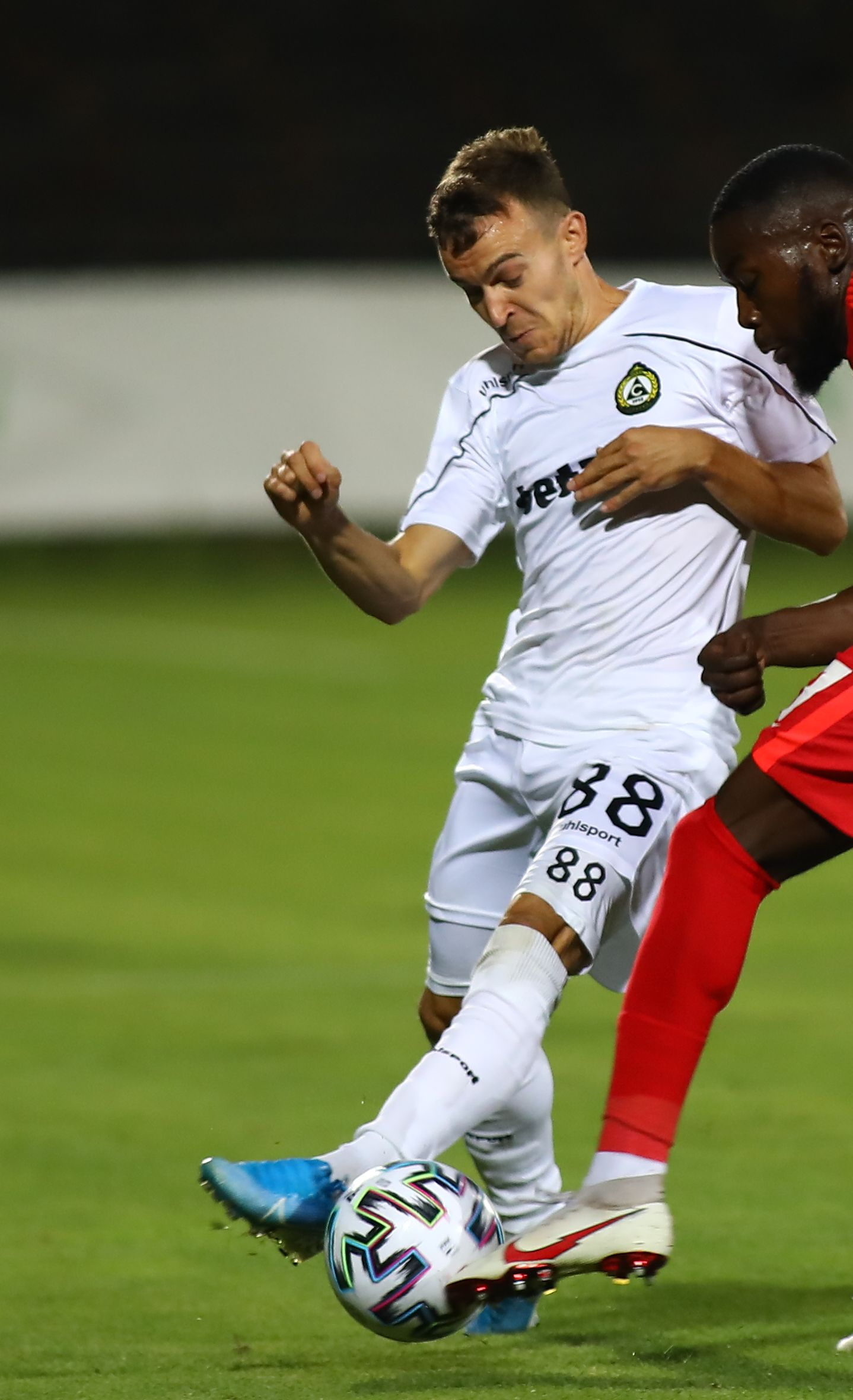

Personal information
- Full name: Toni Georgiev Tasev
- Date of birth: 25 March 1994 (age 32)
- Place of birth: Mihnevo, Bulgaria
- Height: 1.75 m (5 ft 9 in)
- Position: Winger

Team information
- Current team: Pirin Blagoevgrad
- Number: 10

Youth career
- –2013: Pirin 2001

Senior career*
Years	Team	Apps	(Gls)
2013–2017	Pirin Blagoevgrad	104	(12)
2017–2018	Botev Plovdiv	12	(0)
2018	→ Montana (loan)	12	(3)
2018–2021	Montana	77	(19)
2021–2024	Slavia Sofia	94	(23)
2024–2025	Erzurumspor	9	(0)
2025–2026	Slavia Sofia	6	(1)
2026	Belasitsa Petrich	11	(0)
2026–	Pirin Blagoevgrad	10	(1)

International career
2015–2016	Bulgaria U21	5	(1)
- * Club domestic league appearances and goals as of 5 November 2026

Toni Tasev (Bulgarian: Тони Тасев; born 25 March 1994) is a Bulgarian professional footballer who plays as a winger for Pirin Blagoevgrad.

== Career ==
=== Pirin ===
Born in Blagoevgrad, Tasev is a product of the Pirin 2001 academy. On 30 August 2013, he joined Pirin Blagoevgrad and made his senior debut two days later, coming on as a substitute against Velbazhd Kyustendil at Osogovo Stadium in a game of the third division. Tasev scored his first goal in a 3–0 away win over Sportist Svoge on 29 September.

=== Botev Plovdiv ===
On 7 June 2017, Tasev signed a 2-year contract with Botev Plovdiv as a free agent. On 29 June Tasev made an official debut for Botev Plovdiv during the 3–1 away win over Partizani Tirana in the 1st qualifying round of UEFA Europa League. On 6 June 2018, Tasev, who had been on loan at Montana during the spring, was released from Botev Plovdiv.

=== Montana ===
On 19 June 2018, Tasev signed with Montana.

== International career ==
On 7 March 2016, Tasev was called up for the first time to the Bulgaria national team for the friendly matches against Portugal and against Macedonia, but did not debut.

== Career statistics ==
=== Club ===
As of 10 May 2024

Club performance			League		Cup		Continental		Other		Total	
Club	League	Season	Apps	Goals	Apps	Goals	Apps	Goals	Apps	Goals	Apps	Goals
Bulgaria			League		Bulgarian Cup		Europe		Other (Note: Includes Bulgarian Supercup matches.)		Total	
Pirin Blagoevgrad	V Group	2013–14	20	4	0	0	–		–		20	4
Pirin Blagoevgrad	B Group	2014–15	25	8	1	0	–		–		26	8
Pirin Blagoevgrad	A Group	2015–16	28	0	1	0	–		–		29	0
Pirin Blagoevgrad	First League	2016–17	31	0	1	0	–		–		32	0
Pirin Blagoevgrad	Total		104	12	3	0	0	0	0	0	107	12
Botev Plovdiv	First League	2017–18	12	0	2	0	5	0	1	0	20	0
Montana	Second League	2017–18	12	3	0	0	–		–		12	3
Montana	Second League	2018–19	29	8	1	0	–		–		30	8
Montana	Second League	2019–20	21	6	0	0	–		–		21	6
Montana	First League	2020–21	27	5	1	1	–		–		28	6
Montana	Total		89	22	2	1	0	0	0	0	91	23
Slavia Sofia	First League	2021–22	28	6	5	3	–		–		33	9
Slavia Sofia	First League	2022–23	30	7	3	1	–		–		33	8
Slavia Sofia	First League	2023–24	28	9	2	0	–		–		30	9
Slavia Sofia	Total		86	22	10	4	0	0	0	0	96	26
Career statistics			291	56	17	5	5	0	1	0	314	61

== Honours ==
=== Club ===
Botev Plovdiv

- Bulgarian Supercup: 2017
