= General Todorov (village) =

- Village
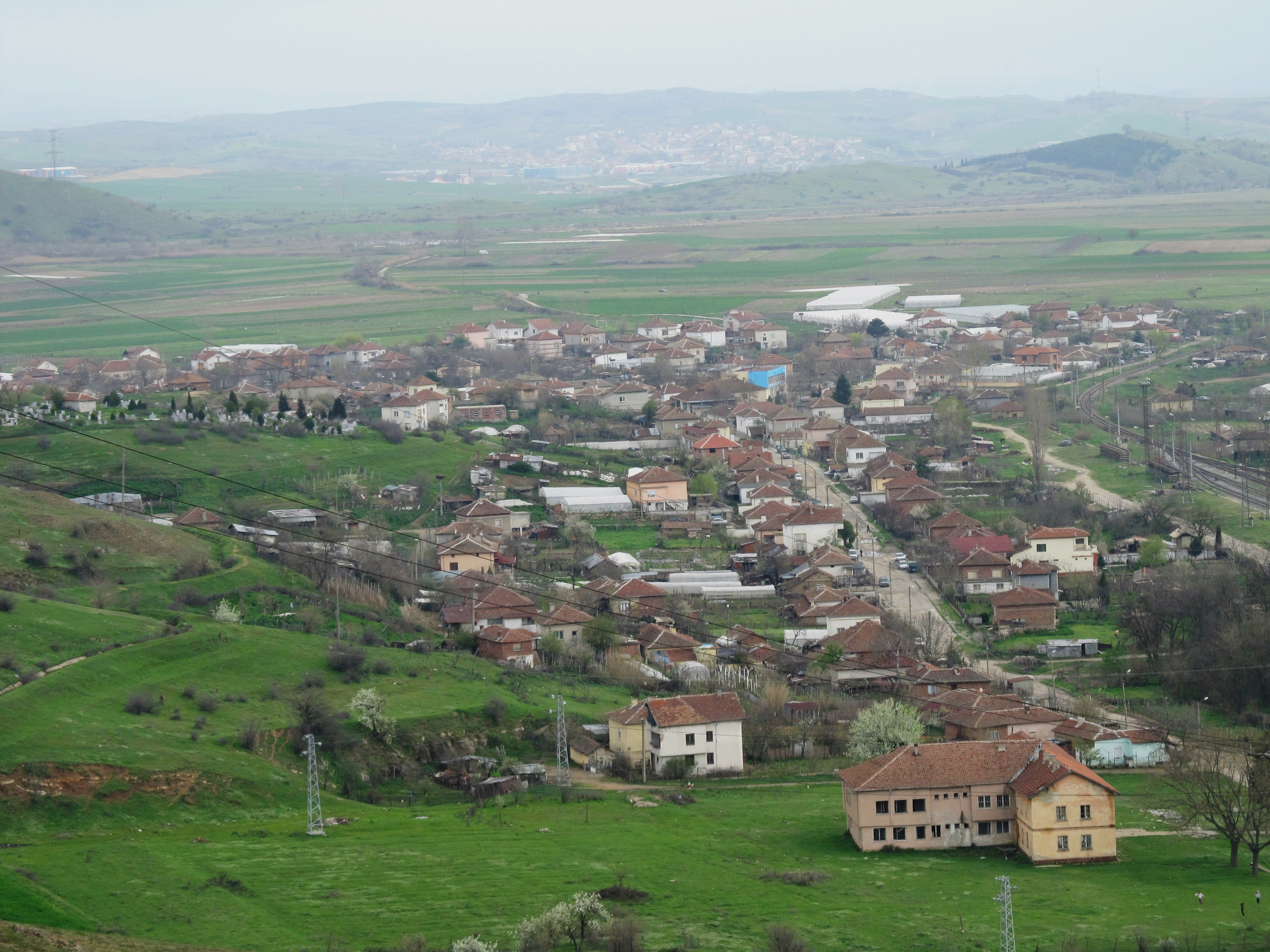

- Location within Bulgaria
- Coordinates: 41.467000°N 23.267000°E
- Country: Bulgaria
- Province: Blagoevgrad Province
- Municipality: Petrich Municipality
- Time zone: UTC+2 (EET)
  - Summer (DST): UTC+3 (EEST)

General Todorov (Bulgarian: Генерал Тодоров [ɡɛnɛˈraɫ todoˈrɔf]) is a village in Petrich Municipality, in Blagoevgrad Province, Bulgaria. Before 1984, it was known as Pripechene (Припечене [priˈpɛt͡ʃɛnɛ]). As of 2013, it had a population of 668.

== History ==
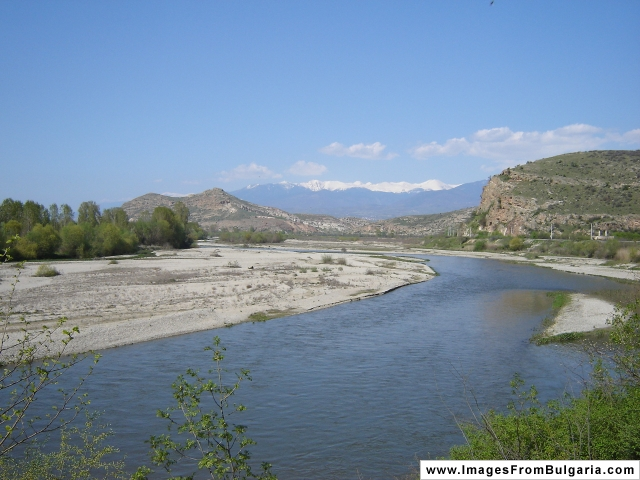
The river Struma near General Todorov

The previous name of the village is Pripechene (Bulgarian: Припечене). During the Ottoman period, the village had a mixed Bulgarian and Turkish population. According to an Ottoman document from 1519 there were 6 Muslim and 39 non-Muslim households in Pripechene. The main occupation of the population in Pripechene was farming rice. A Vasil Kanchov study of 1900 counted 114 Bulgarian and 70 Turkish inhabitants.

The village was renamed General Todorov after general Georgi Todorov in 1984.
