= Ivanovo, Blagoevgrad Province =

Ivanovo
- Village
- Location within Bulgaria
- Coordinates: 41°53′N 23°11′E
- Country: Bulgaria
- Province: Blagoevgrad Province
- Municipality: Petrich Municipality

Population (2013)
  - Total: 4
- Time zone: UTC+2 (EET)
  - Summer (DST): UTC+3 (EEST)

Ivanovo, Blagoevgrad Province is a village in Petrich Municipality, in Blagoevgrad Province, Bulgaria. As of 2013, it had a population of 4.
