= Churilovo, Bulgaria =

Churilovo
- Village
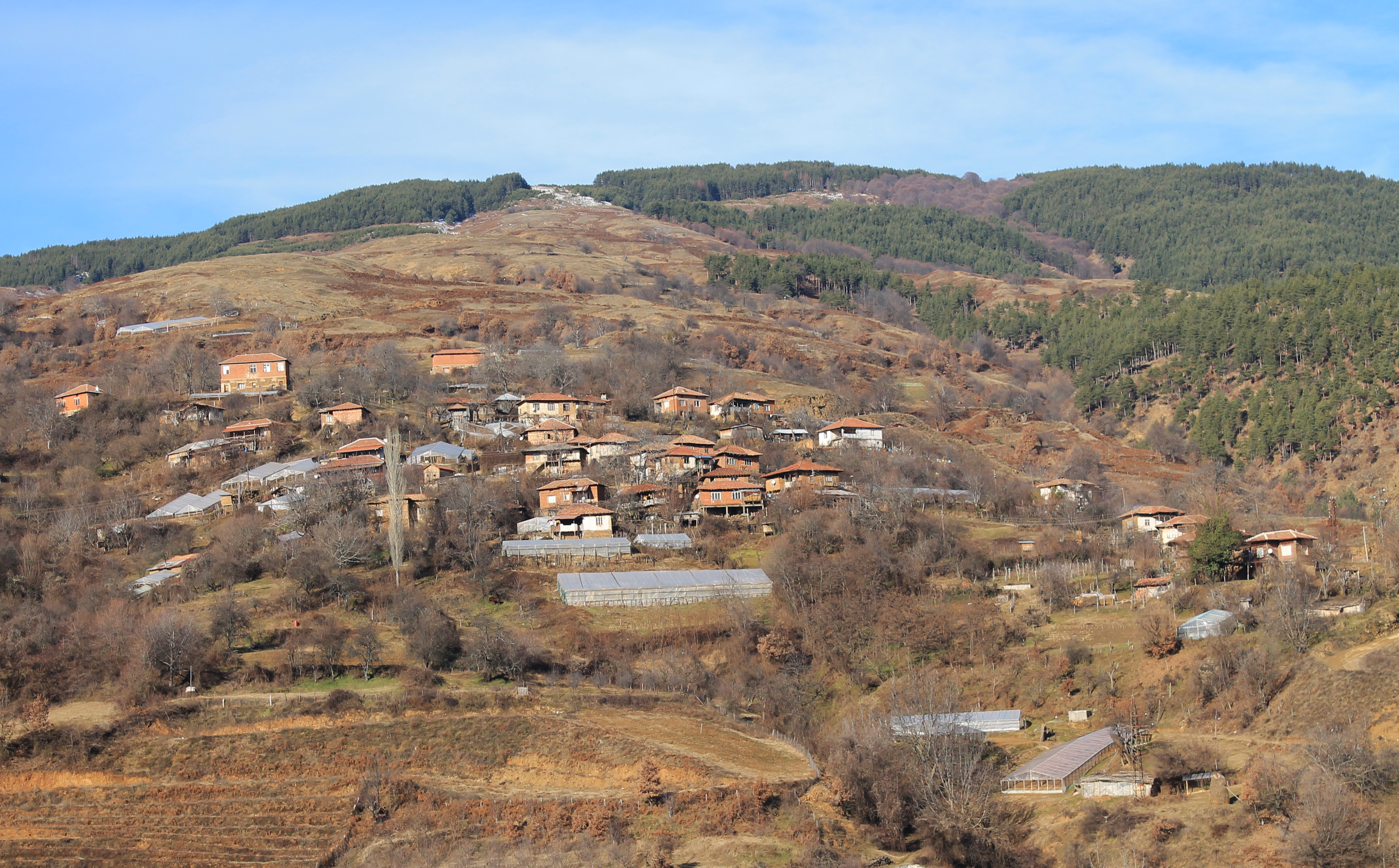

- Location within Bulgaria
- Coordinates: 41°28′N 23°00′E
- Country: Bulgaria
- Province: Blagoevgrad Province
- Municipality: Petrich Municipality

Population (2013)
  - Total: 40
- Time zone: UTC+2 (EET)
  - Summer (DST): UTC+3 (EEST)

Churilovo (Bulgarian: Чурилово) is a village in Petrich Municipality, in Blagoevgrad Province, Bulgaria. As of 2013, there were 177 inhabitants.
