= Starchevo =

- Village
- Location within Bulgaria
- Coordinates: 41°29′N 23°14′E
- Country: Bulgaria
- Province: Blagoevgrad Province
- Municipality: Petrich Municipality

Government
  - Mayor: Georgi Kuzmanov
- Elevation: 131 m (430 ft)

Population (2010)
  - Total: 624
- Time zone: UTC+2 (EET)
  - Summer (DST): UTC+3 (EEST)

Starchevo or Starchovo (Bulgarian: Старчево or Старчово, Greek: Στάρτσοβο) is a village in Petrich Municipality, in Blagoevgrad Province, Bulgaria.
