= Dolene =

Dolene Долене
- Village
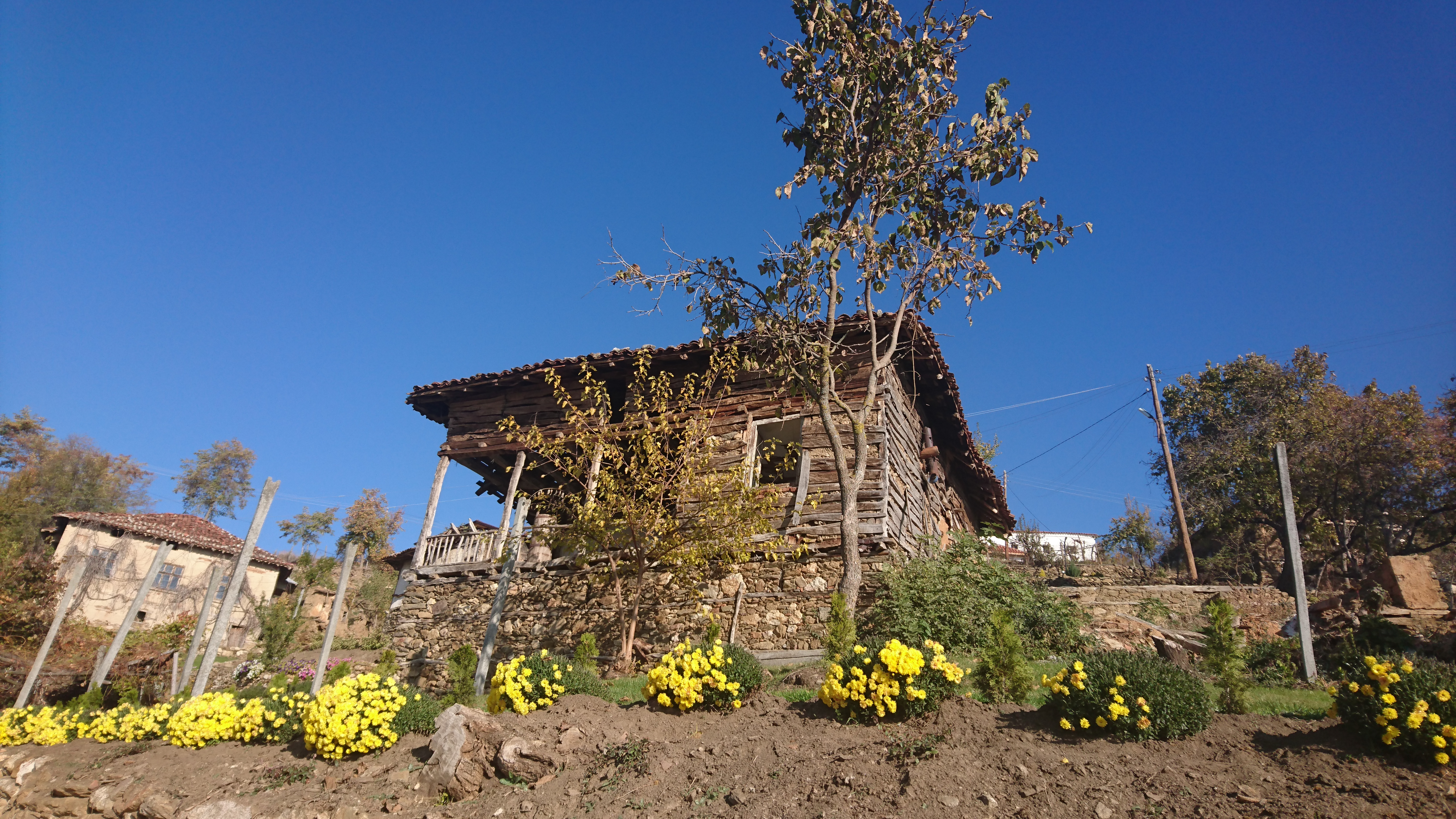

- Location within Bulgaria
- Coordinates: 41.44566030413195°N 23.03098136874828°E
- Country: Bulgaria
- Province: Blagoevgrad Province
- Municipality: Petrich Municipality

Population (2013)
  - Total: 15
- Time zone: UTC+2 (EET)
  - Summer (DST): UTC+3 (EEST)

Dolene is a village in Petrich Municipality, in Blagoevgrad Province, Bulgaria.

From the 16th to the 19th centuries, the village hosted the Dolensky Fair. Dolene now is only home to a few people but is a tourist attraction with a team of about 30 working there. The restoration started 2018 by local benefactor Stefan Lipiyski whose parents grew up there. According to Wasił Kynczow by 1900 the village was inhabited by 600 Bulgarian Christians. In 2011, the population of Dolene was 24.
