= Zoychene =

- Village
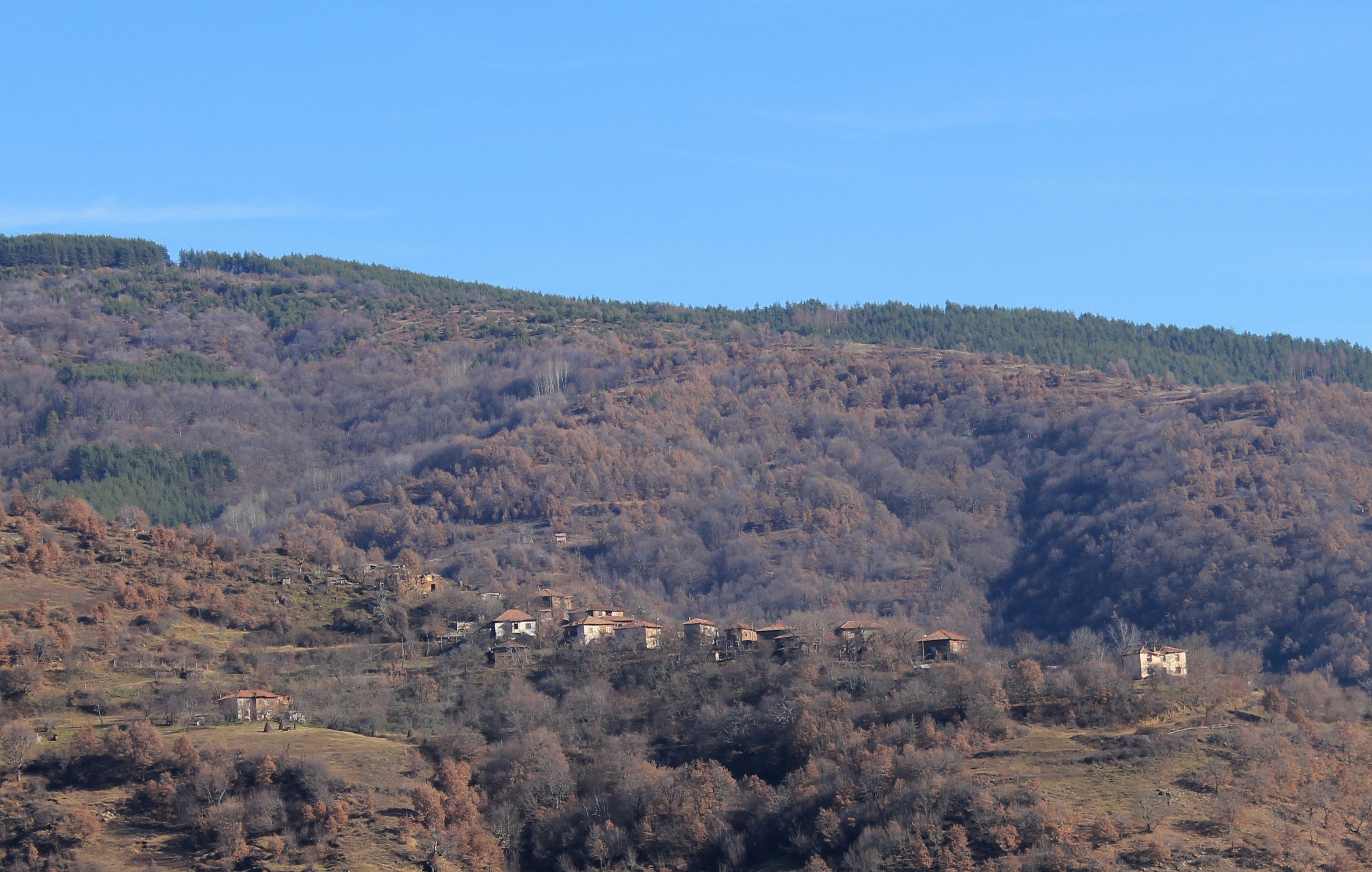

- Location within Bulgaria
- Coordinates: 41°28′N 23°02′E
- Country: Bulgaria
- Province: Blagoevgrad Province
- Municipality: Petrich Municipality
- Time zone: UTC+2 (EET)
  - Summer (DST): UTC+3 (EEST)

Zoychene is a village in Petrich Municipality, in Blagoevgrad Province, Bulgaria.
