= Dolno Spanchevo =

- Village
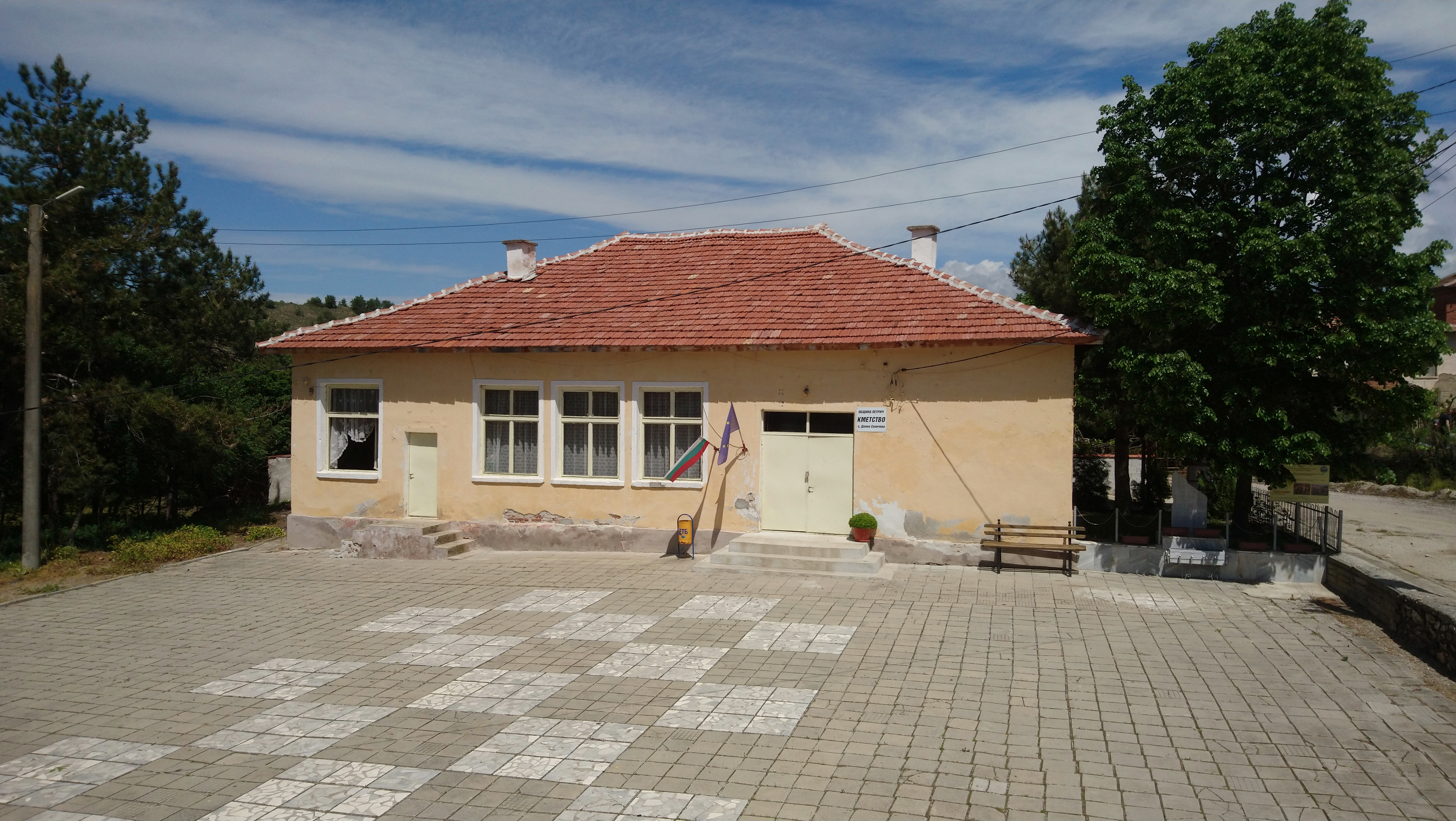
- Dolno Spanchevo mayor's office

- Location within Bulgaria
- Coordinates: 41°25′N 23°23′E
- Country: Bulgaria
- Province: Blagoevgrad Province
- Municipality: Petrich Municipality

Population (2024)
  - Total: 52
- Time zone: UTC+2 (EET)
  - Summer (DST): UTC+3 (EEST)

Dolno Spanchevo (Bulgarian: Долно Спанчево) is a village located in Petrich Municipality, in Blagoevgrad Province, Bulgaria of southwestern Bulgaria. It falls within the administrative boundaries of the Petrich Municipality and has a population of 52. The village is situated relatively close to the town of Petrich, which is a larger municipality center in the region.

== History ==
The church of Saint George was built in 1859.

The "La Macédoine et sa Population Chrétienne" survey by Dimitar Mishev concluded that the Christian population in Dolno-Spantchovo in 1905 was composed of 200 Bulgarian Exarchists.
