= Topolnitsa, Blagoevgrad Province =

Topolnitsa
- Village
- Location within Bulgaria
- Coordinates: 41°24′N 23°19′E
- Country: Bulgaria
- Province: Blagoevgrad Province
- Municipality: Petrich Municipality
- Time zone: UTC+2 (EET)
  - Summer (DST): UTC+3 (EEST)

Topolnitsa is a village in Petrich Municipality, in Blagoevgrad Province, Bulgaria.
