= Dimitrios Itsios =

Greek military personnel (1906–1941)

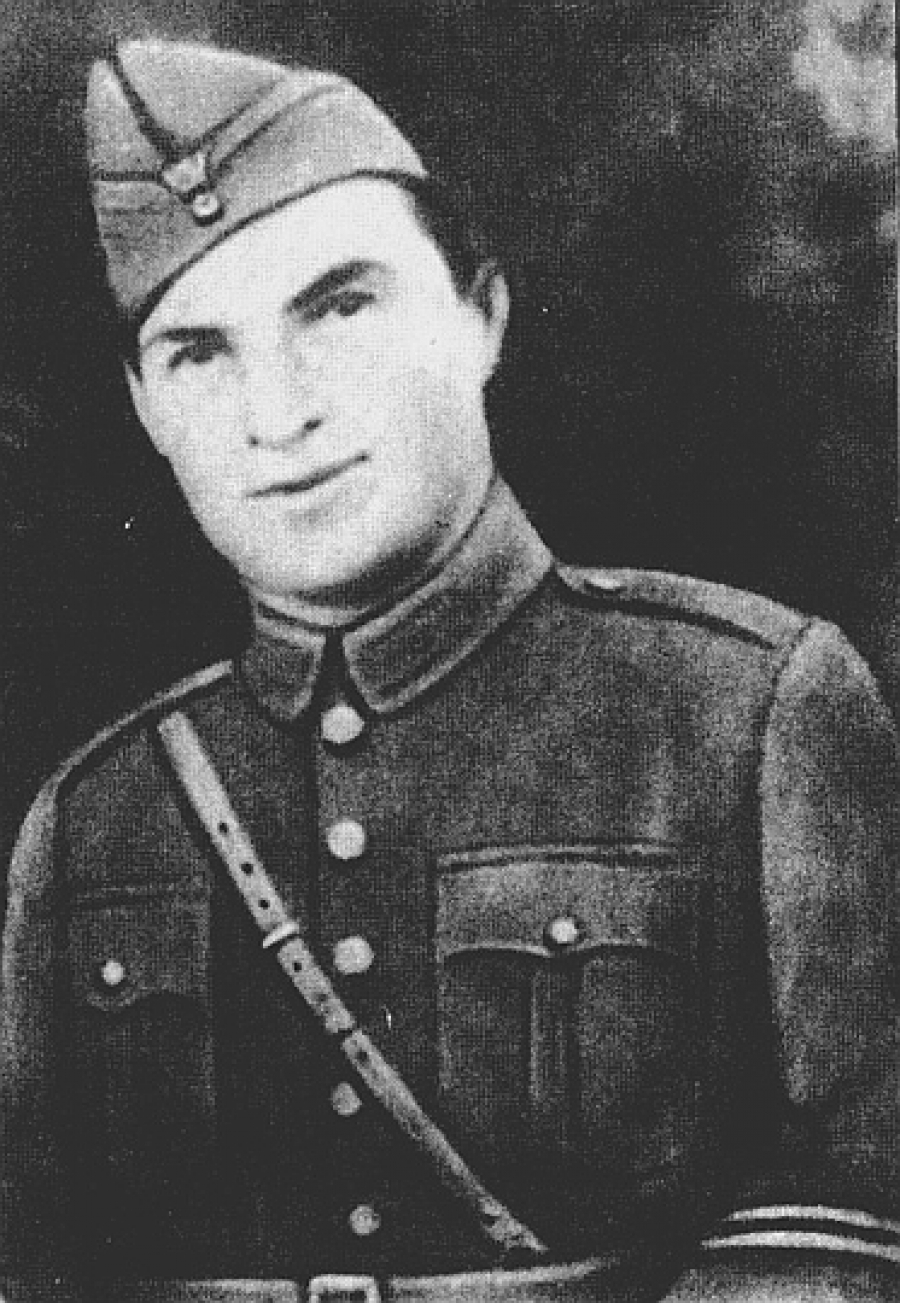
- Photograph of Dimitrios Itsios
- Native name: Δημήτριος Ίτσιος
- Born: 1906; Ano Poroia, Salonica Vilayet, Ottoman Empire (now Greece)
- Died: April 1941 (aged 34–35) Metaxas Line, Kingdom of Greece
- Cause of death: Execution; gunshot wounds
- Allegiance: Kingdom of Greece
- Rank: Master sergeant
- Conflicts: World War II; Greco-Italian War; German invasion of Greece; Battle of the Metaxas Line (executed)
- Spouse: Anna Nanopoulou
- Children: Maria; Anastasios

Dimitrios Itsios (Greek: Δημήτριος Ίτσιος; 5 April 1906 – 6 April 1941) was a Hellenic Army non-commissioned officer of the reserves and war hero of World War II.

== Biography ==
He was born in the family of Efstathios Intzos in 1906, in the village of Ano Poroia in Central Macedonia, which was then still within the Ottoman Empire. The village was liberated by the Hellenic Army after victories over the Turks and Bulgarians in the Balkan Wars (1912-1913), when Dimitrios was just 6 years old. The border with Bulgaria was established two dozen kilometers north of the village, along the ridge of Kerkini.

During the First World War, the village was once again occupied by the Bulgarians. After the defeat of Bulgaria and during the Greek-Bulgarian population exchange, the Bulgarian-speaking part of the population left the village.

Dimitrios Itsios was married to his fellow villager Anna K. Nanopoulou, with whom he had two children, Maria and Anastasios.

In April 1941, during the German invasion of Greece, Itsios was a sergeant in command of a five man machine gun crew, consisting of Pillbox P8. He inflicted heavy losses on the invaders, ultimately running out of ammunition. Itsios surrendered to the German troops, but was executed by order of general Ferdinand Schörner.

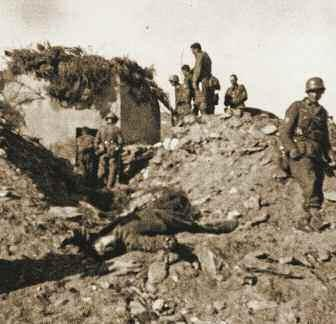
The body of Itsios after his execution, 1941.

Dimitrios Itsios was posthumously promoted to master sergeant.
