= Bogoroditsa (village) =

- Village
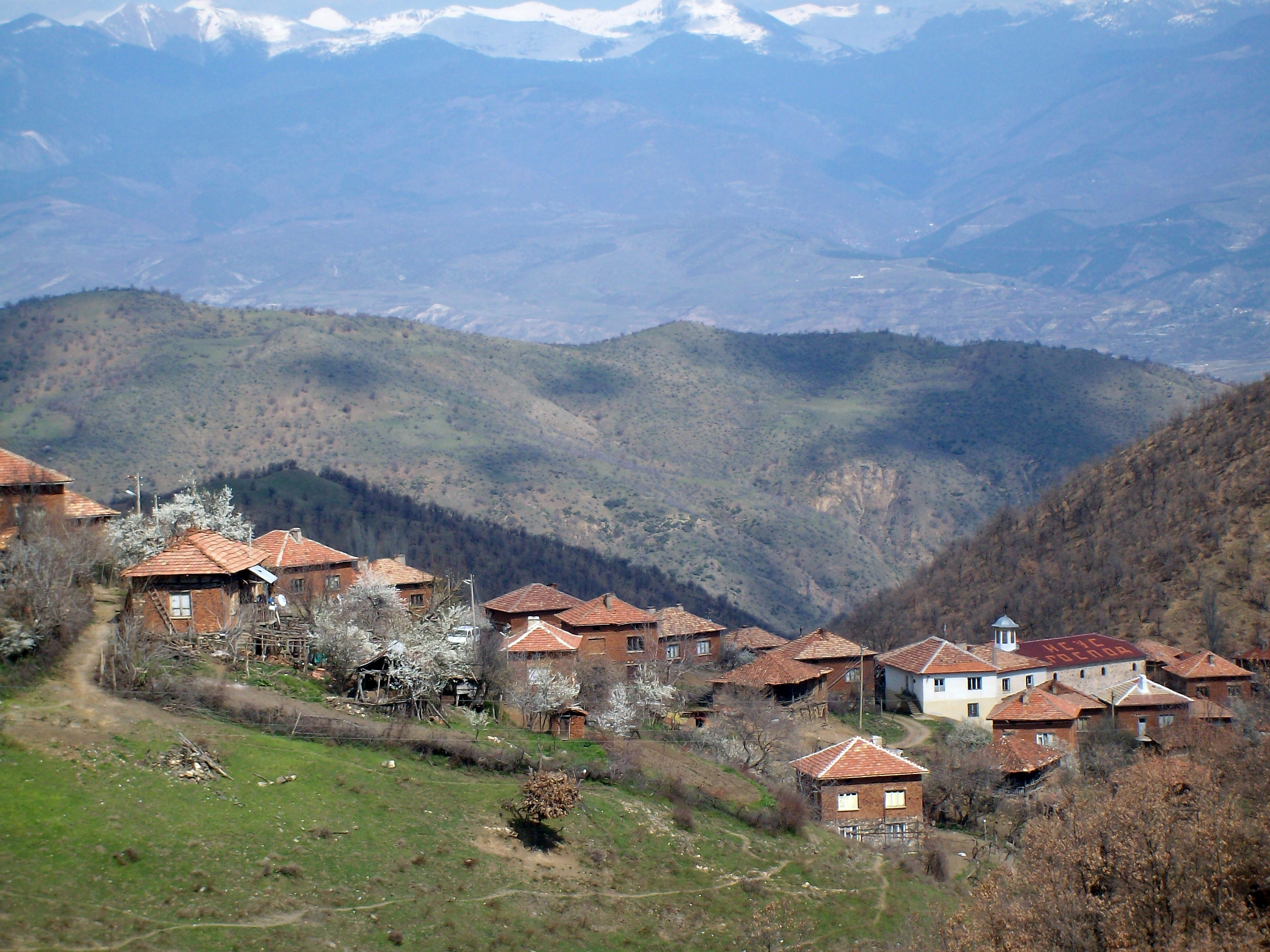

- Location within Bulgaria
- Coordinates: 41°31′N 23°11′E
- Country: Bulgaria
- Province: Blagoevgrad Province
- Municipality: Petrich

Population (2013)
  - Total: 24
- Time zone: UTC+2 (EET)
  - Summer (DST): UTC+3 (EEST)

Bogoroditsa (Bulgarian: Богородица) is a village in Petrich Municipality, in Blagoevgrad Province, Bulgaria. The Greek name of village is "Μπογορόδιτσα". As of 2013, it had a population of 24.
