= Gega, Bulgaria =

Gega Гега
- Village
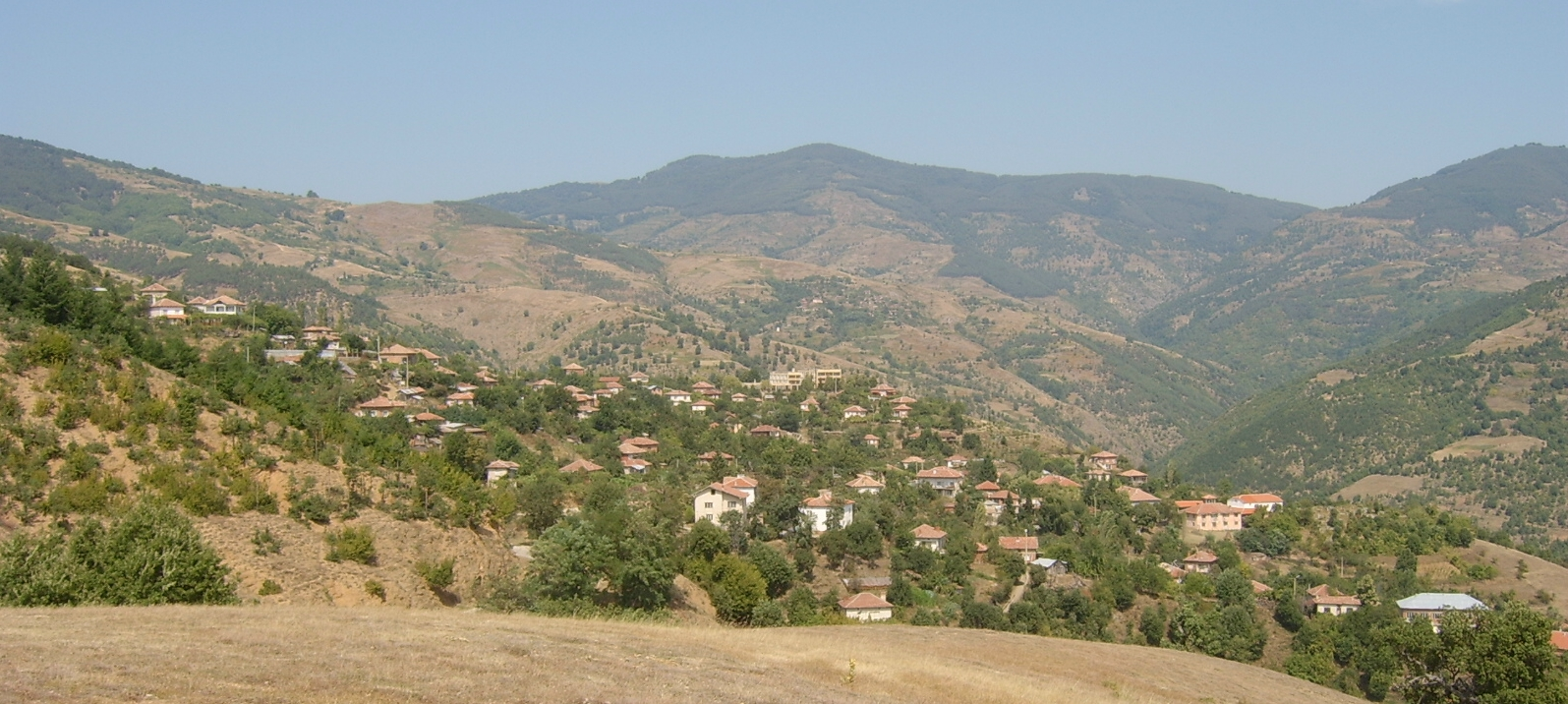
- Panoramic view of the village

- Location in Bulgaria
- Coordinates: 41°27′0″N 23°00′0″E
- Country: Bulgaria
- Province: Blagoevgrad
- Municipality: Petrich

Area
  - Total: 15,772 km^{2} (6,090 sq mi)
- Elevation: 700 m (2,300 ft)

Population (2015)
  - Total: 249
- Time zone: UTC+2 (EET)
  - Summer (DST): UTC+3 (EEST)
- Postal code: 2882
- Area code: 074204
- Vehicle registration: Е

Gega (Bulgarian: Гега [ˈɡɛɡɐ]) is a village in Petrich Municipality, in Blagoevgrad Province, Bulgaria. As of 2013, it had a population of 219.
