= Marino Pole =

Marino pole
- Village
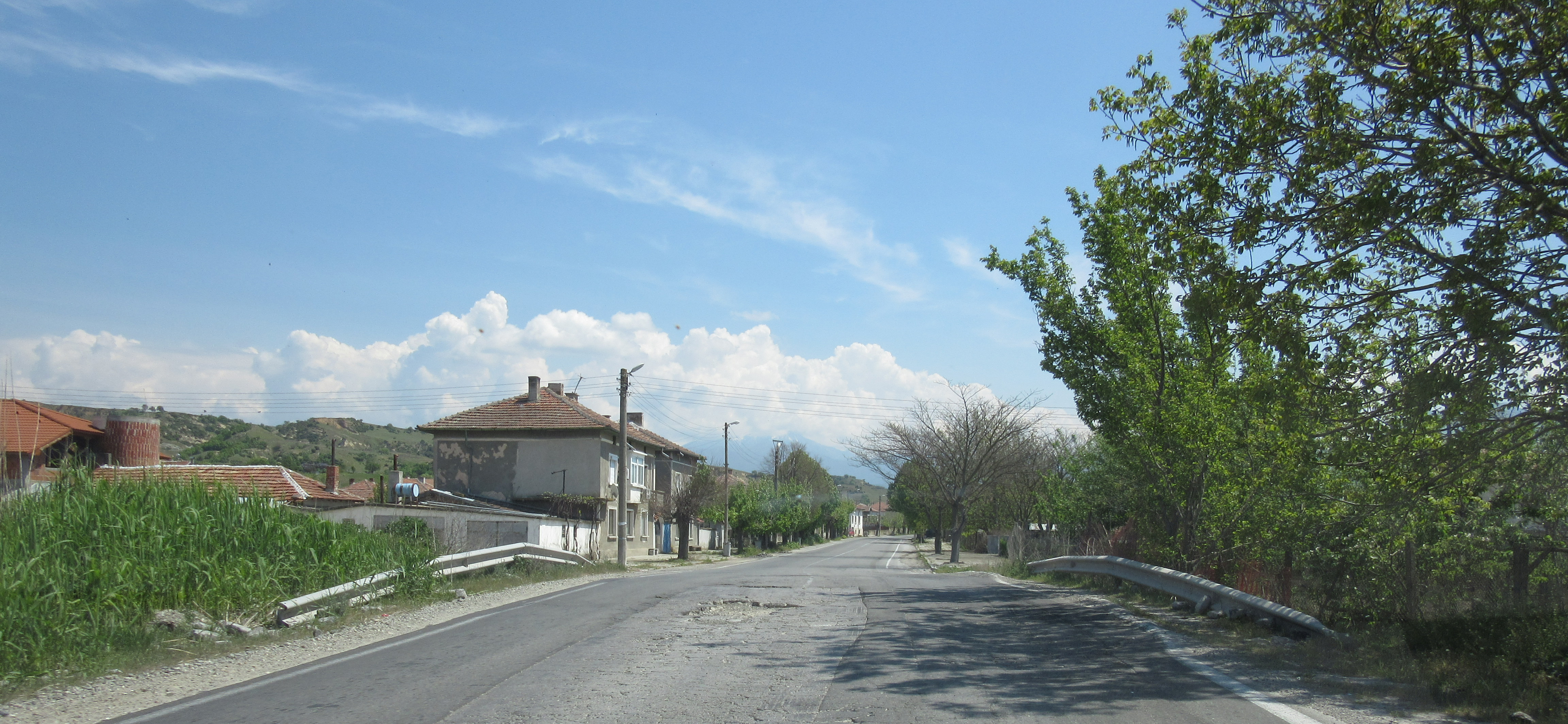

- Location within Bulgaria
- Coordinates: 41°24′47″N 23°20′58″E
- Country: Bulgaria
- Province: Blagoevgrad Province
- Municipality: Petrich Municipality
- Time zone: UTC+2 (EET)
  - Summer (DST): UTC+3 (EEST)

Marino pole (Bulgarian: Ма̀рино полѐ) is a village in Petrich Municipality, in Blagoevgrad Province, Bulgaria. The Greek name of village is "Μαρινούπολις" (Marinoupolis).
