= Kapatovo =

- Village
- Location within Bulgaria
- Coordinates: 41°28′N 23°22′E
- Country: Bulgaria
- Province: Blagoevgrad Province
- Municipality: Petrich Municipality
- Time zone: UTC+2 (EET)
  - Summer (DST): UTC+3 (EEST)

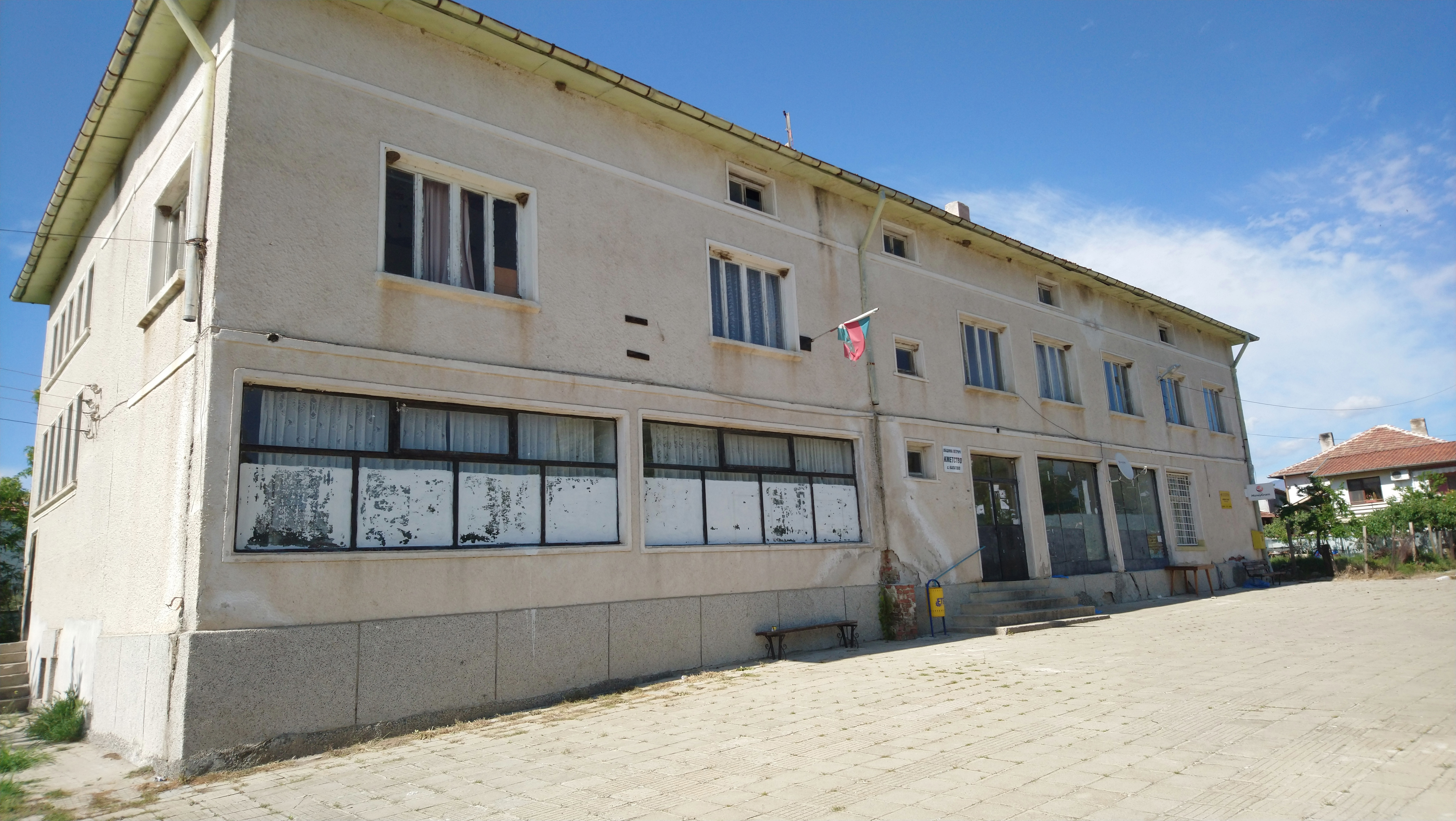

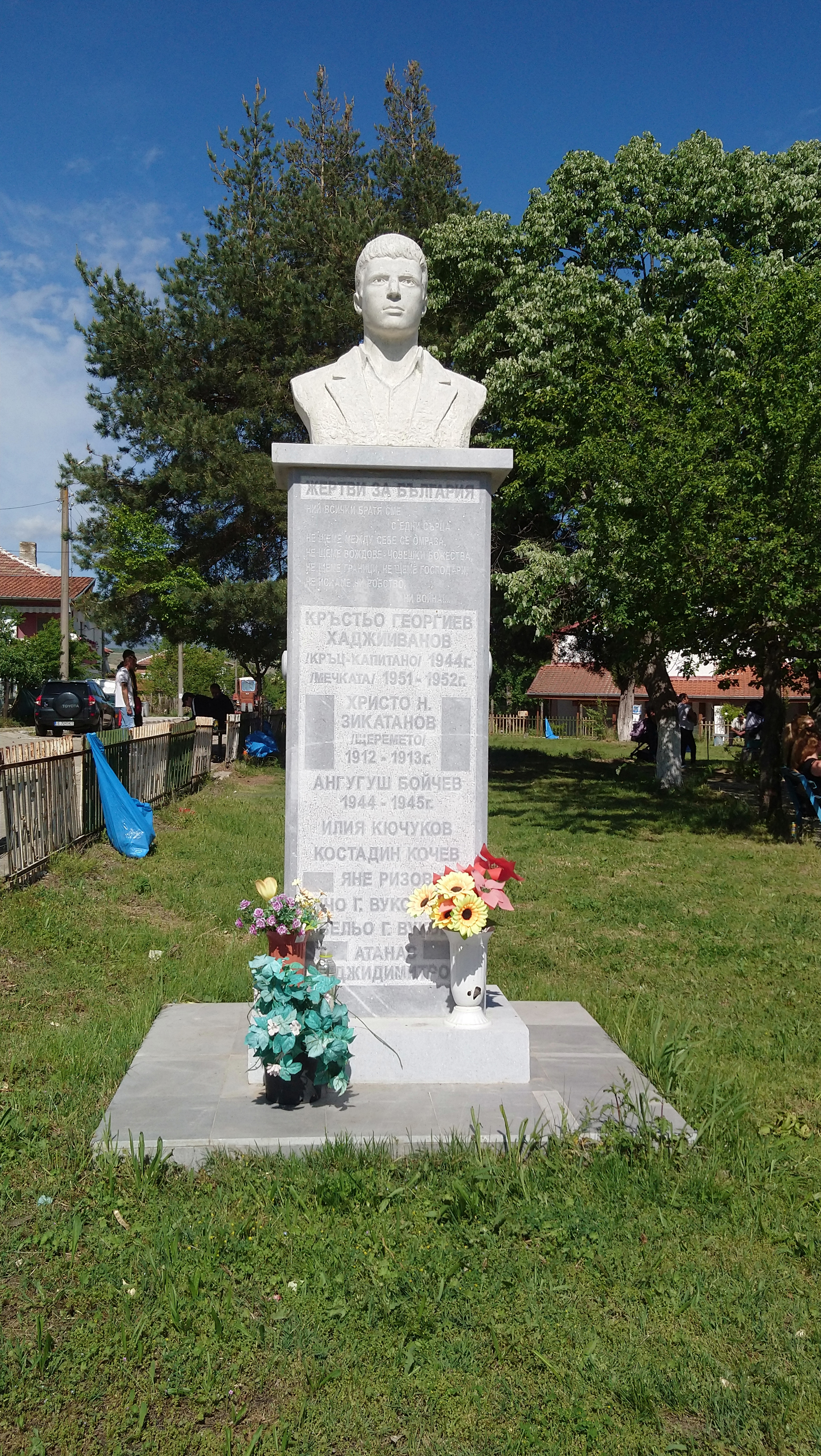
Monument to Krastyo Hadjiivanov, in Kapatovo village

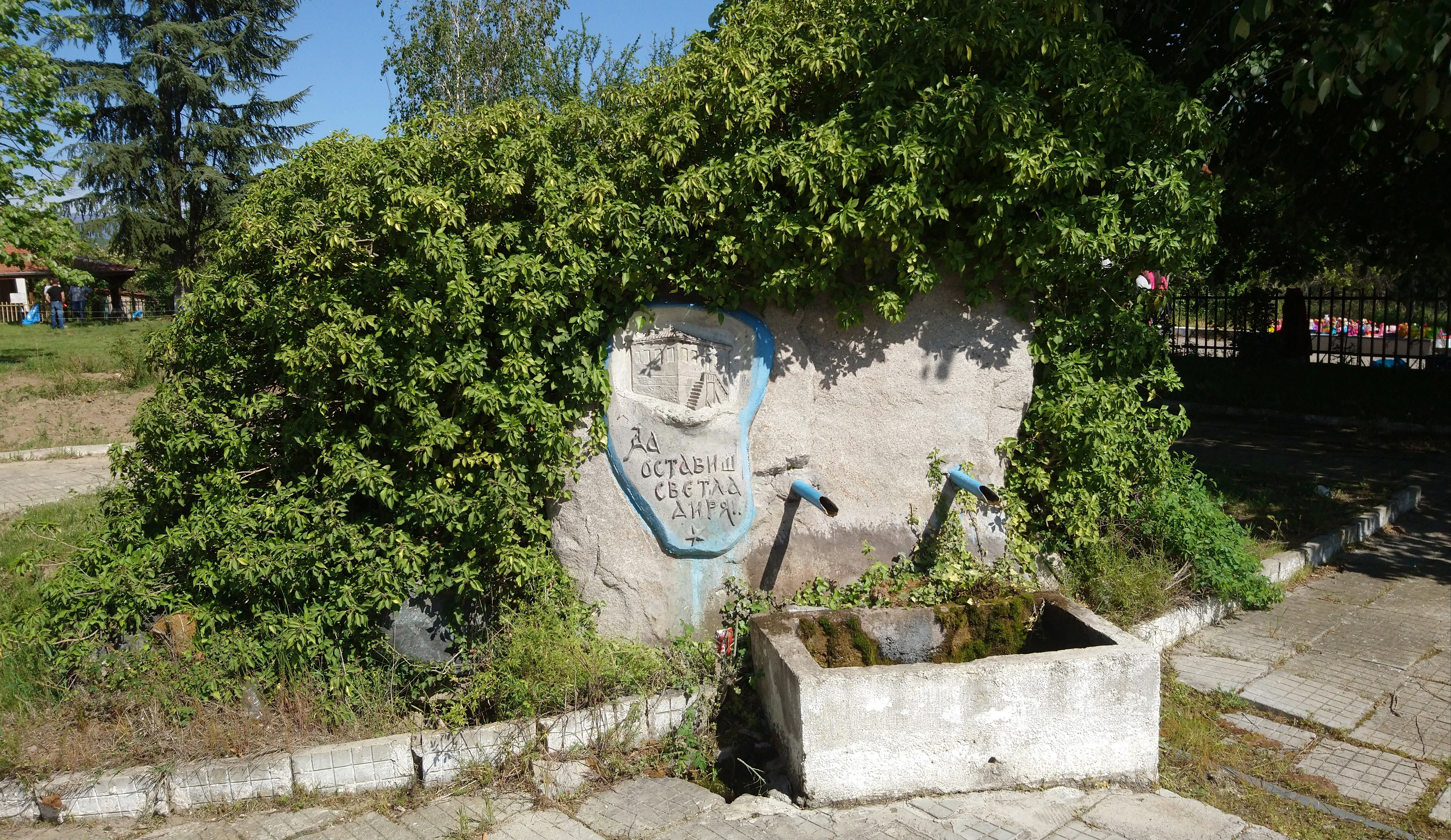
A fountain in the center of the village of Kapatovo with the inscription "To leave a light trail"

Kapatovo is a village in Petrich Municipality, in Blagoevgrad Province, Bulgaria. As of 2013, it had a population of 195.
