= Petrich Municipality =

Coordinates: 41.4149°N 23.2388°E

Petrich Municipality Община Петрич
- Municipality
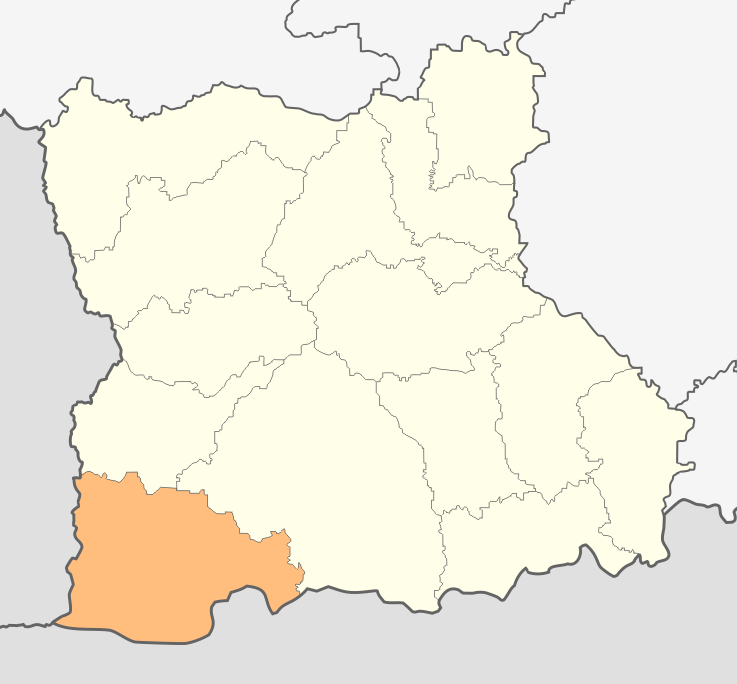
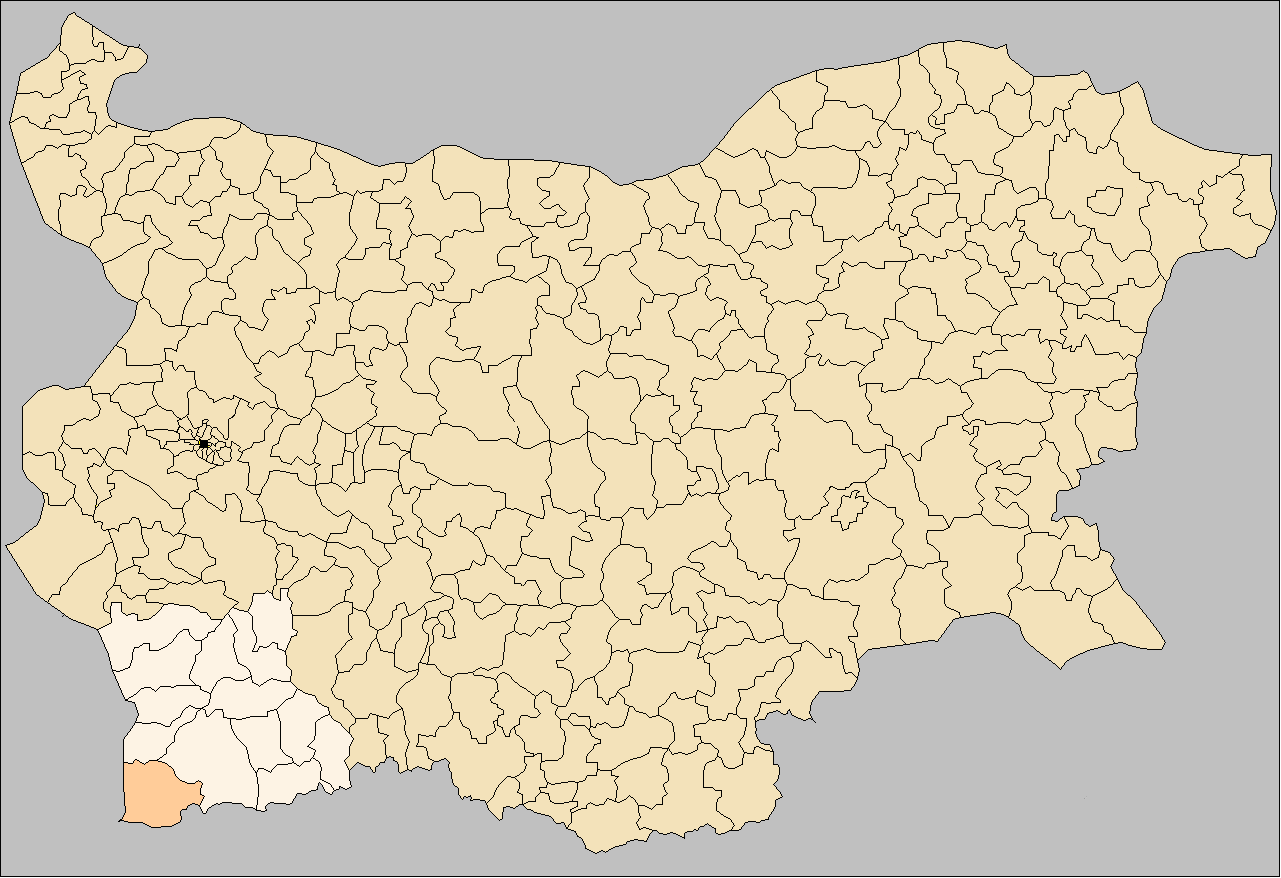
- Location in Blagoevgrad province Location on map of Bulgaria
- Country: Bulgaria
- Province (Oblast): Blagoevgrad

Area
  - Total: 650.13 km^{2} (251.02 sq mi)

Population (2021)
  - Total: 47,949
  - Density: 73.753/km^{2} (191.02/sq mi)

Petrich Municipality is a municipality in Blagoevgrad Province in Southwestern Bulgaria. It had a population of 47,949 at the 2021 Census.

== Religion ==
According to the latest Bulgarian census of 2011, the religious composition, among those who answered the optional question on religious identification, was the following:

Religious composition of Petrich Municipality
Orthodox Christianity	93.90%
Catholicism	0.26%
Protestantism	0.40%
Islam	0.67%
No religion	2.36%
Prefer not to answer, others and indefinable	2.41%

== List of villages ==
The following lists the 55 villages in the municipality:

- Baskaltsi
- Belasitsa
- Bogoroditsa
- Borovichene
- Chuchuligovo
- Churicheni
- Churilovo
- Dolene
- Dolna Krushitsa
- Dolna Ribnitsa
- Dolno Spanchevo
- Dragush
- Drangovo
- Drenovitsa
- Drenovo
- Gabrene
- Gega
- General Todorov
- Gorchevo
- Ivanovo
- Karnalovo
- Kavrakirovo
- Kamena
- Kapatovo
- Kladentsi
- Klyuch
- Kolarovo
- Krandzhilitsa
- Kromidovo
- Kukurahtsevo
- Kulata
- Marikostinovo
- Marino Pole
- Mendovo
- Mitino
- Mihnevo
- Novo Konomladi
- Parvomay
- Petrich
- Pravo Bardo
- Ribnik
- Rupite
- Razhdak
- Samuilova Krepost
- Samuilovo
- Skrat
- Starchevo
- Strumeshnitsa
- Tonsko Dabe
- Topolnitsa
- Vishlene
- Volno
- Yavornitsa
- Yakovo
- Zoychene
