= Klyuch =

- Village
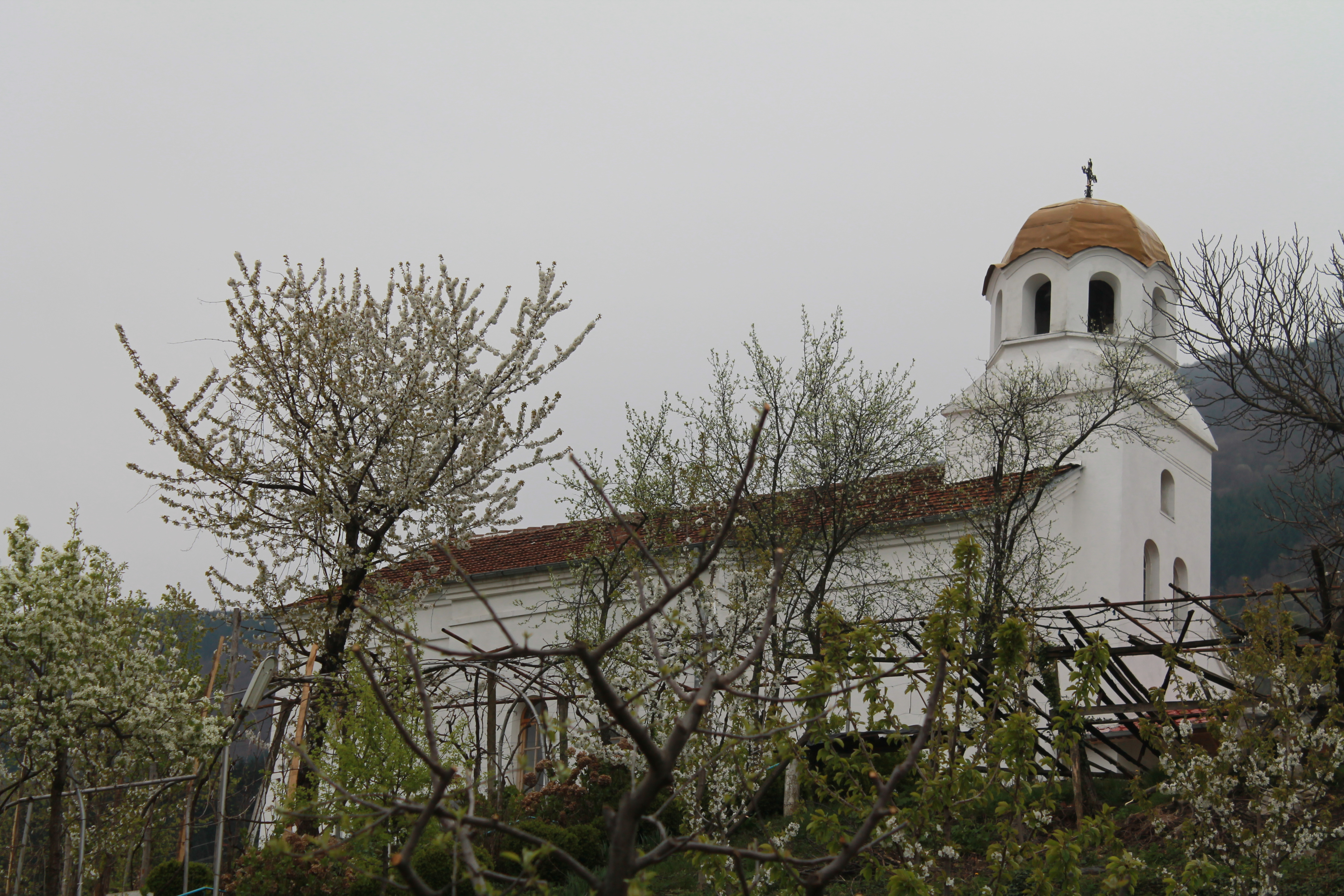
- Church "St. Prophet Elijah", Klyuch

- Location within Bulgaria
- Coordinates: 41°21′44″N 23°01′03″E
- Country: Bulgaria
- Province: Blagoevgrad Province
- Municipality: Petrich Municipality
- Elevation: 455 m (1,493 ft)
- Time zone: UTC+2 (EET)
  - Summer (DST): UTC+3 (EEST)

Klyuch (Bulgarian: Ключ, "key"; also transliterated Кључ, Ključ, Kliuch, Kljuch, etc., Medieval Greek: Κλειδίον, Kleidion, Latin: Clidium) is a village in south-westernmost Bulgaria, part of Petrich Municipality, Blagoevgrad Province. It lies 455 metres above sea level. As of 2005, it has a population of 1,113 and the mayor is Hristo Markov.

Klyuch lies at the northern foot of the Belasitsa mountains, south of the Strumeshnitsa River, in the geographic region of Podgorie. The climate is transitional Mediterranean, with a summer minimum and a winter maximum of precipitation.

The village is famous for the Battle of Kleidion of 29 July 1014, in which Tsar Samuil's forces were routed by Byzantine Emperor Basil II's army. After the battle, Basil ordered all 14,000 Bulgarian captives blinded, with a single soldier left one-eyed to guide every hundred blinded home.

Five kilometres north of the village are the ruins of Samuil's Fortress, built between 1009 and 1013, and the Samuil's Fortress National Park-Museum, created in 1982 and featuring a bronze monument to Samuil.

Klyuch is also famous for several alleged cases of UFO, mostly popularized by the local Kiril Yakimov.

Bulgarian international footballer Spas Delev (b. 1989) was born in Klyuch. He plays for Lokomotiv Sofia.
