= Kamena, Blagoevgrad Province =

Kamena
- Village
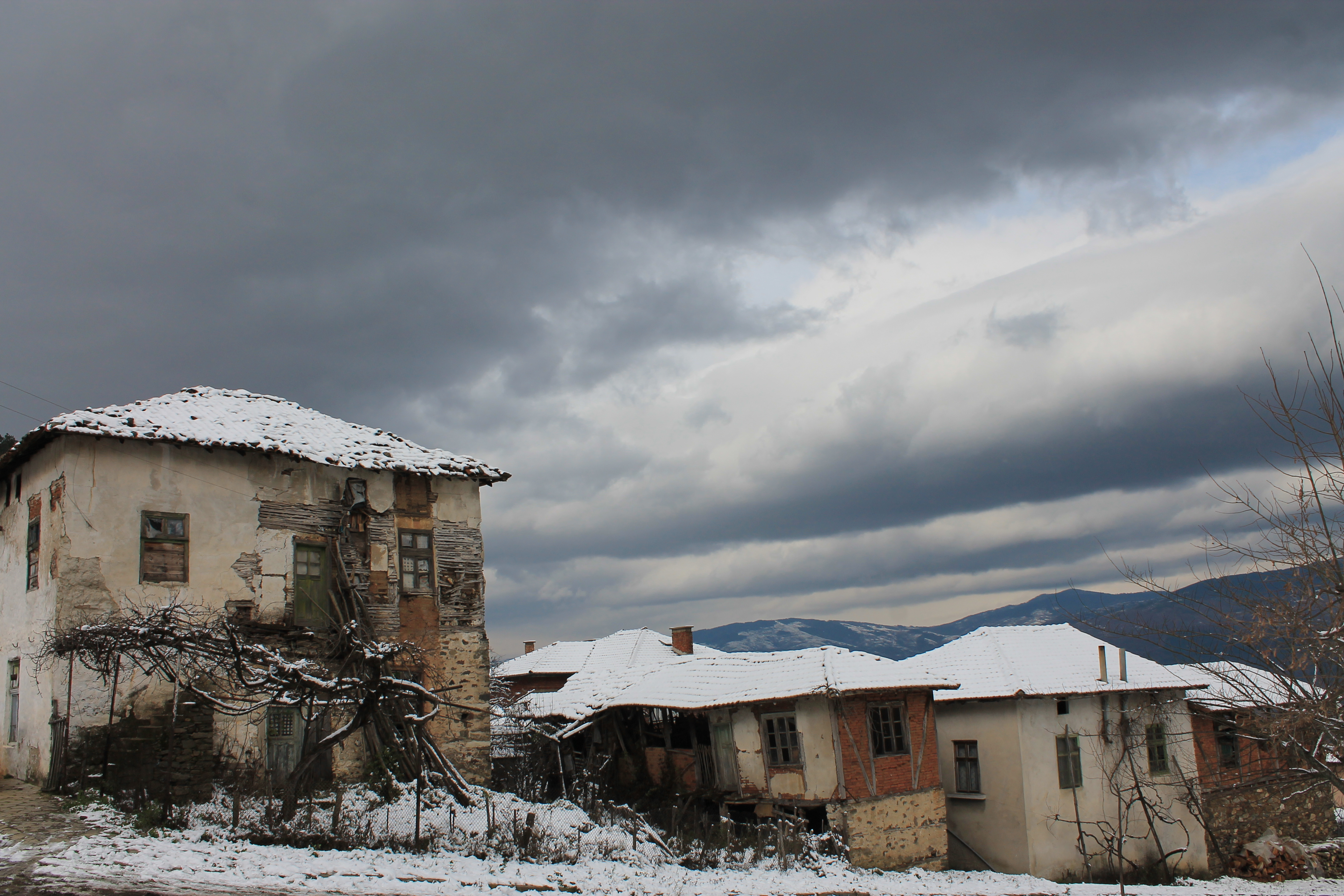

- Location in Bulgaria
- Coordinates: 41°22′N 23°04′E
- Country: Bulgaria
- Province: Blagoevgrad Province
- Municipality: Petrich Municipality
- Time zone: UTC+2 (EET)
  - Summer (DST): UTC+3 (EEST)

Kamena is a village in Petrich Municipality, in Blagoevgrad Province, Bulgaria. The Greek name of village is "Κάμινα". As of 2013, it had a population of 278.
