= Drangovo, Blagoevgrad Province =

- Village
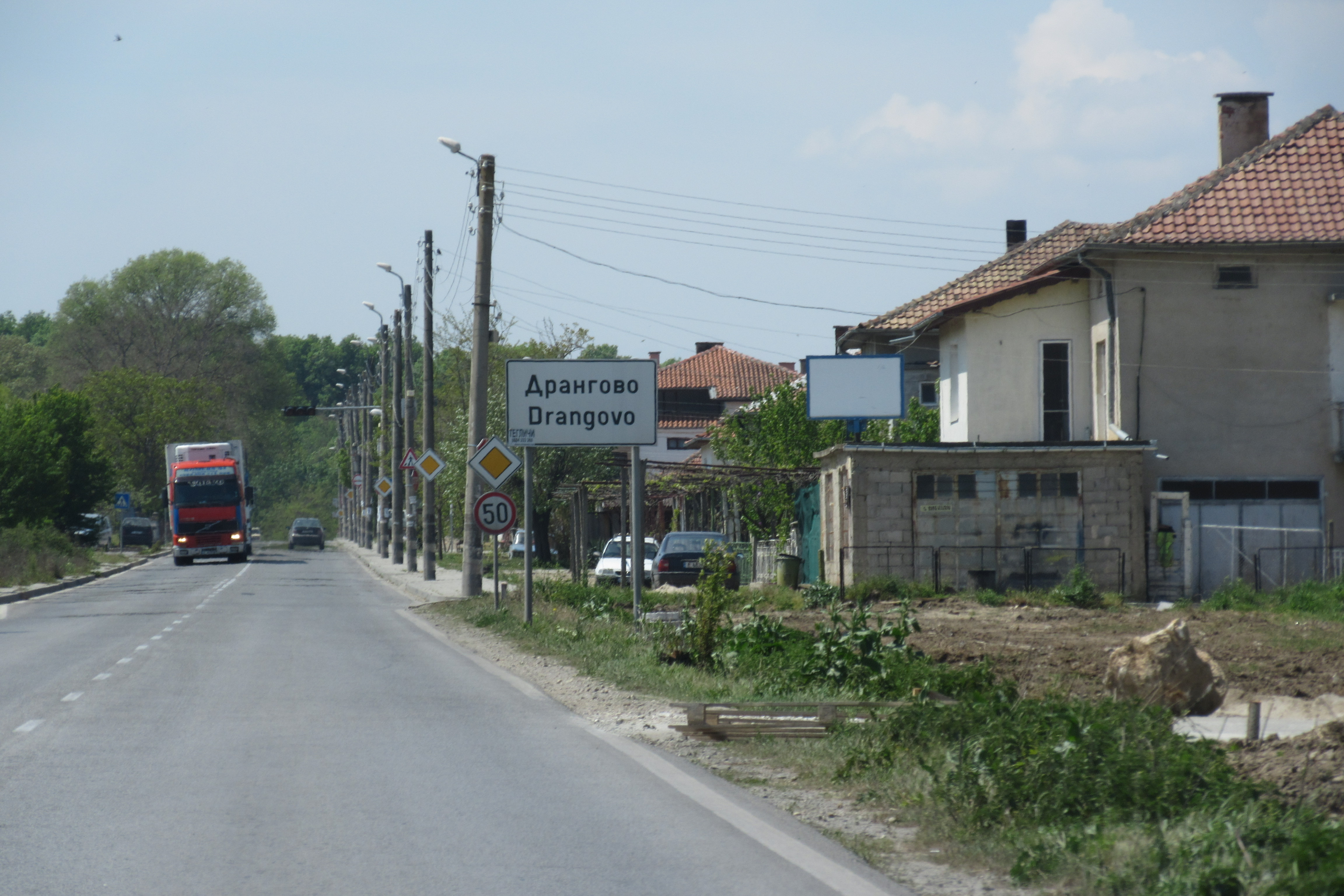
- Road sign in Drangovo entrance

- Location within Bulgaria
- Coordinates: 41°25′N 23°17′E
- Country: Bulgaria
- Province: Blagoevgrad Province
- Municipality: Petrich Municipality
- Time zone: UTC+2 (EET)
  - Summer (DST): UTC+3 (EEST)

Drangovo is a village in Petrich Municipality, in Blagoevgrad Province, Bulgaria. As of 2013, it had a population of 516.
