= Mitino, Blagoevgrad Province =

Bulgarian municipality

Coordinates: 41°26′N 23°15′E

Mitino is a village in Petrich Municipality, in Blagoevgrad Province, Bulgaria.
