= Yavornitsa =

- Village
- Location within Bulgaria
- Coordinates: 41°22′N 23°03′E
- Country: Bulgaria
- Province: Blagoevgrad Province
- Municipality: Petrich Municipality
- Time zone: UTC+2 (EET)
  - Summer (DST): UTC+3 (EEST)

Yavornitsa is a village in Petrich Municipality, in Blagoevgrad Province, Bulgaria. The Greek name of village is "Γαβερνίτσα".
