= Samuilova Krepost =

- Village
- Location within Bulgaria
- Coordinates: 41°22′N 23°00′E
- Country: Bulgaria
- Province: Blagoevgrad Province
- Municipality: Petrich Municipality
- Time zone: UTC+2 (EET)
  - Summer (DST): UTC+3 (EEST)

Samuilova Krepost is a village in Petrich Municipality, in Blagoevgrad Province, Bulgaria. It is commonly used as a tourist attraction.
