= Strumica (river) =

Strumica Strumeshnitsa
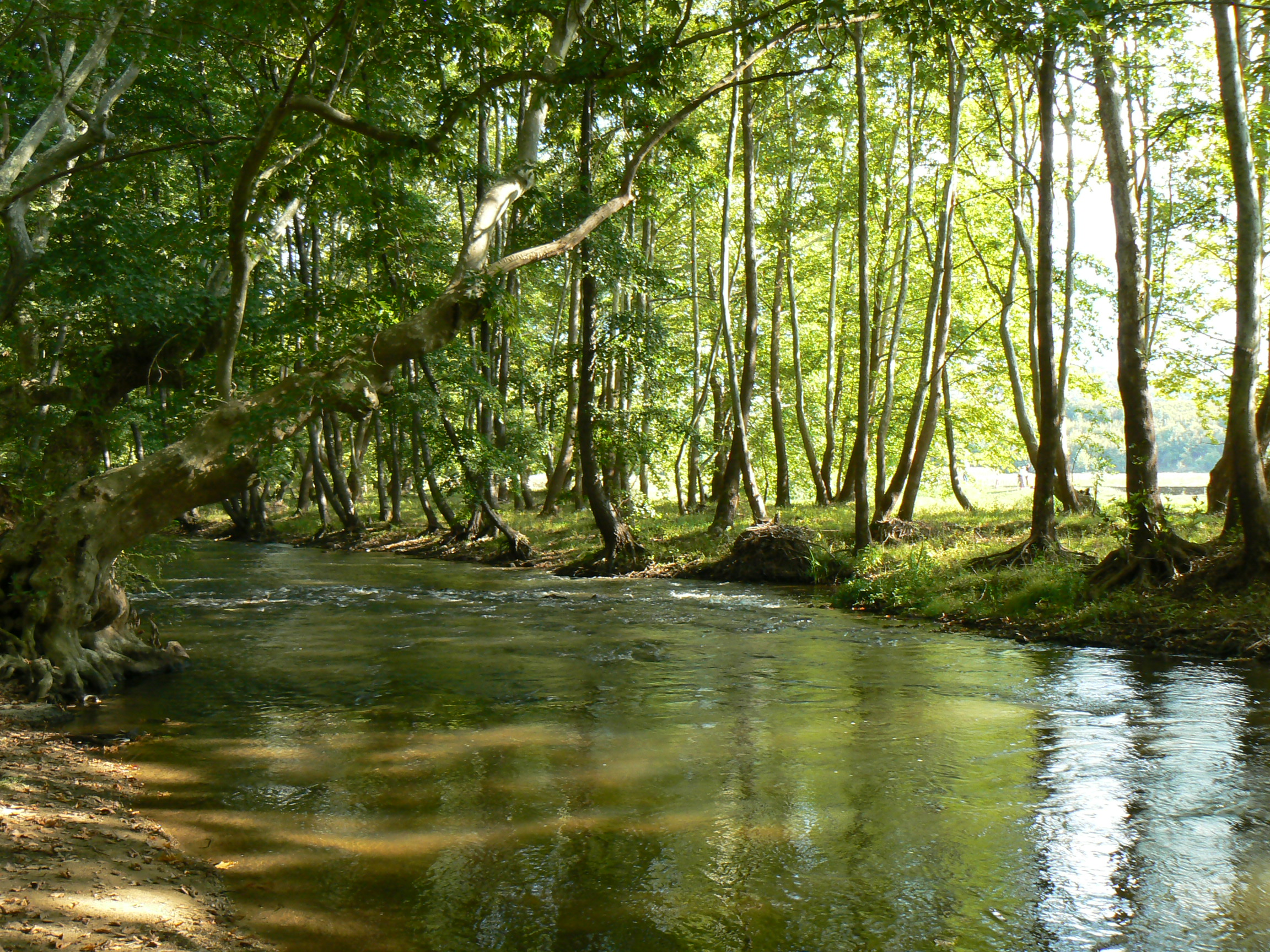
- The lower course of the river in Bulgaria.
- Native name: Струмица (Macedonian); Струмешница (Bulgarian)

Location
- Country: North Macedonia, Bulgaria

Physical characteristics
- Source
  - location: Plačkovica mountain, North Macedonia
- Mouth
  - location: Struma at Mitino, Bulgaria
  - coordinates: 41.4452°N 23.2793°E
- Length: 114 km (71 mi)

Basin features
- Progression: Struma→ Aegean Sea

The Strumica (Macedonian and Bulgarian: Струмица, Macedonian pronunciation: [ˈstrumit͡sa]; also transliterated Strumitsa or Strumitza) or Strumeshnitsa (Bulgarian: Струмешница) is a river in North Macedonia and Bulgaria. It runs through the town of Strumica and flows into the river Struma.

The Strumica takes its source from the Plačkovica mountain in Radoviš municipality in North Macedonia, running south in a deep valley and then known as the Stara Reka. It then enters the Radoviš Valley and runs through the eponymous town of Radoviš. Afterwards the Strumica runs southeastwards through the Strumica Valley (Vasilevo, Strumica and Novo Selo municipality), passing through the town of Strumica and turning east to enter Bulgaria south of Zlatarevo. A wide meandering valley follows until the river flows into the Struma as a right tributary northeast of Mitino, not far from Rupite.

The river has a total length of 114 km, of which 81 km in North Macedonia and 33 km in Bulgaria. It is Struma's largest tributary.
