= Kladentsi, Blagoevgrad Province =

Kladentsi Кладенци
- Village
- Location in Bulgaria
- Coordinates: 41°25′29″N 23°02′28″E
- Country: Bulgaria
- Province: Blagoevgrad Province
- Municipality: Petrich Municipality

Population (2013)
  - Total: 36
- Time zone: UTC+2 (EET)
  - Summer (DST): UTC+3 (EEST)

Kladentsi is a village in Petrich Municipality, in Blagoevgrad Province, Bulgaria. As of 2013, it had a population of 36.
