= Belasitsa (village) =

- Village
- Location within Bulgaria
- Coordinates: 41°22′N 23°08′E
- Country: Bulgaria
- Province: Blagoevgrad Province
- Municipality: Petrich Municipality

Population (2013)
  - Total: 1,082
- Time zone: UTC+2 (EET)
  - Summer (DST): UTC+3 (EEST)

Belasitsa is a village in Petrich Municipality, in Blagoevgrad Province, Bulgaria. As of 2013, it had a population of 1082.
