= Kolarovo, Blagoevgrad Province =

Kolarovo
- Village
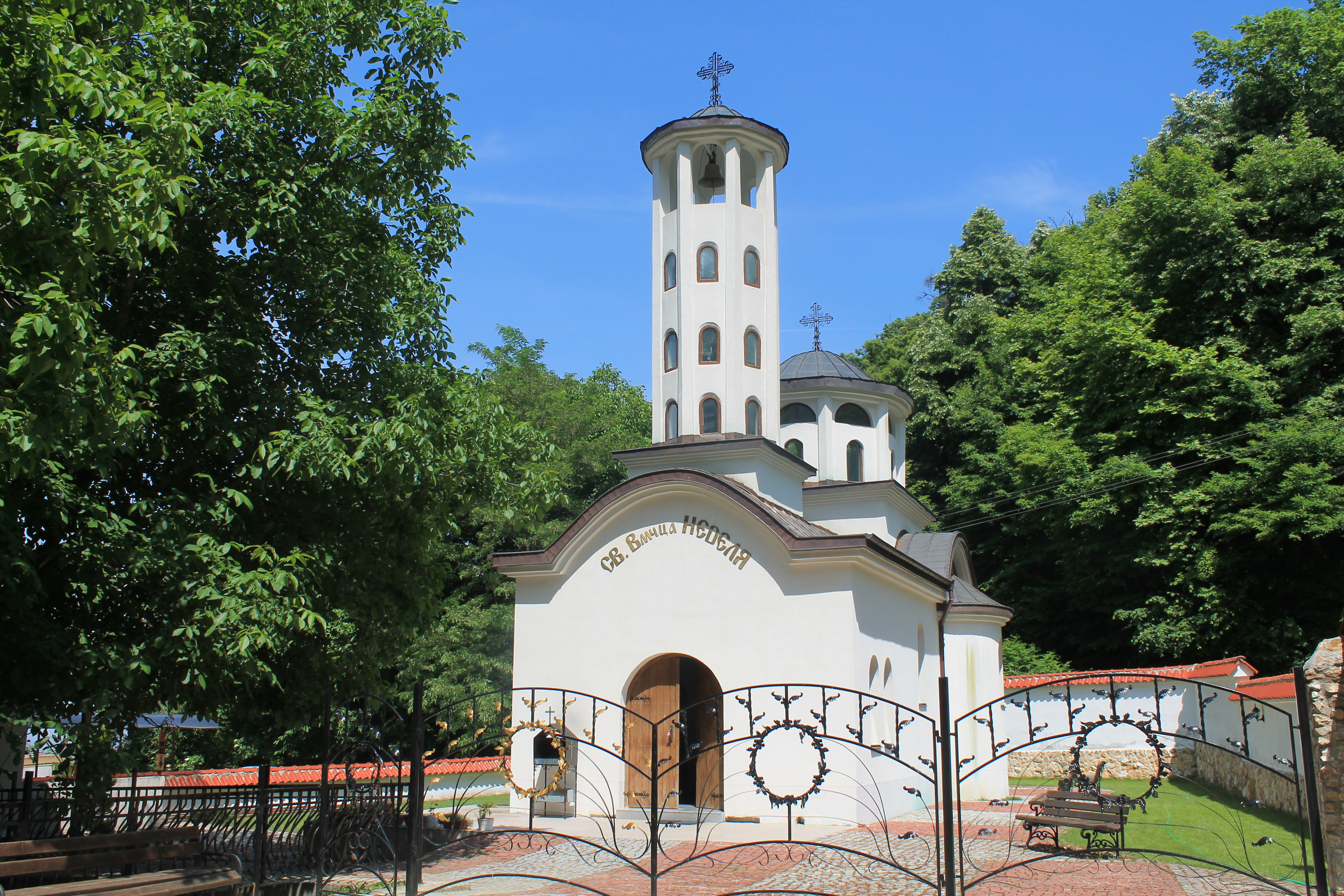

- Location within Bulgaria
- Coordinates: 41°22′N 23°06′E
- Country: Bulgaria
- Province: Blagoevgrad Province
- Municipality: Petrich Municipality
- Time zone: UTC+2 (EET)
  - Summer (DST): UTC+3 (EEST)

Kolarovo is a village in Petrich Municipality, in Blagoevgrad Province, Bulgaria. As of 2013, it had a population of 1826.
