= Skrat, Blagoevgrad Province =

- Village
- Location within Bulgaria
- Country: Bulgaria
- Province: Blagoevgrad Province
- Municipality: Petrich Municipality
- Time zone: UTC+2 (EET)
  - Summer (DST): UTC+3 (EEST)

Skrat is a village in Petrich Municipality, Blagoevgrad Province, in south-western Bulgaria.
