= Sandanski–Petrich Valley =

Valley in Bulgaria

- Valley
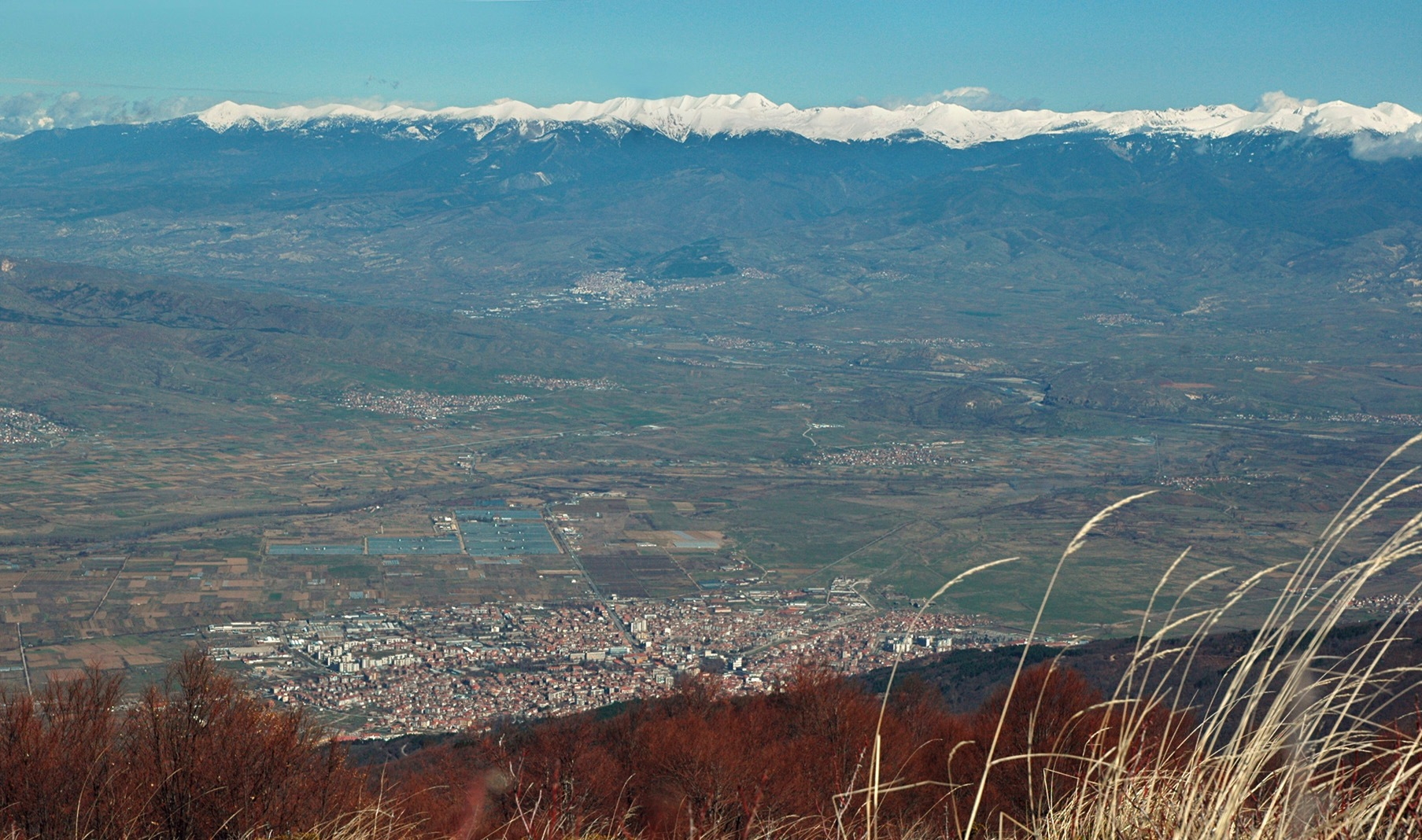
- Sandanski–Petrich Valley seen from Belasitsa mountain range with the snow-capped peaks of the Pirin mountains

- A map of the Sandanski–Petrich Valley
- Coordinates: 41°30′31.8″N 23°15′25.3″E
- Location: Bulgaria

Area
  - Total: 550 km^{2} (210 sq mi)

Dimensions
  - Length: 42 km (26 mi)
  - Width: 13 km (8.1 mi)

Sandanski–Petrich Valley (Bulgarian: Санданско-Петричка котловина, romanized: Sandansko-Petrichka kotlovina) is situated in southwestern Bulgaria along the river Struma and its right tributary Strumeshnitsa, with a very small part of the territory extending to Greece. The valley is enclosed by several mountain ranges, three of them reaching heights of over 2,000 m, and is open to the Strumitsa Valley to the west and the Serres Valley to the south. Due to the proximity to the Aegean Sea, the climate is continental Mediterranean, making Sandanski–Petrich Valley one of the warmest regions of Bulgaria.

Administratively, it falls within Blagoevgrad Province, where it occupies its southwestern-most parts in is divided in four municipalities. It is named after the two most populous cities in the area, Sandanski and Petrich. The mild climate, numerous mineral springs and the abundance of natural and cultural landmarks within the valley and in its proximity favour agriculture, tourism and related industries. Sandanski–Petrich Valley has a strategic location at the border with Greece and the Republic of North Macedonia and lies on the shortest route between the capital Sofia and the Mediterranean Sea.

== Geography ==
=== Geology and overview ===
The valley is located between the mountain ranges of Pirin to the east, Maleshevo and Ograzhden to the west and northwest, Belasitsa to the southwest, Sengelska and Slavyanka to the southeast. To the north, along the course of the river Struma, it connects with the Simitli valley through the Kresna Gorge between Maleshevo and Pirin. To the south it connects with the large Serres Valley in Greece through the Rupel Gorge between Belasitsa and Sengel. To the west it is wide open to the Strumitsa Valley in the Republic of North Macedonia, along the course of the Strumeshnitsa river.

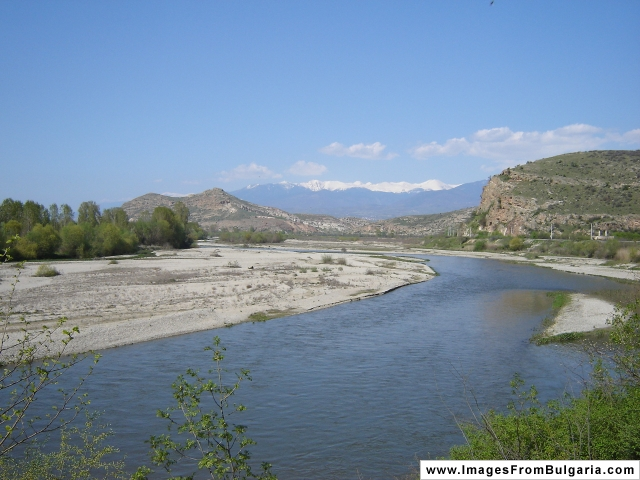
The Struma River passing through the extinct volcano Kozhuh

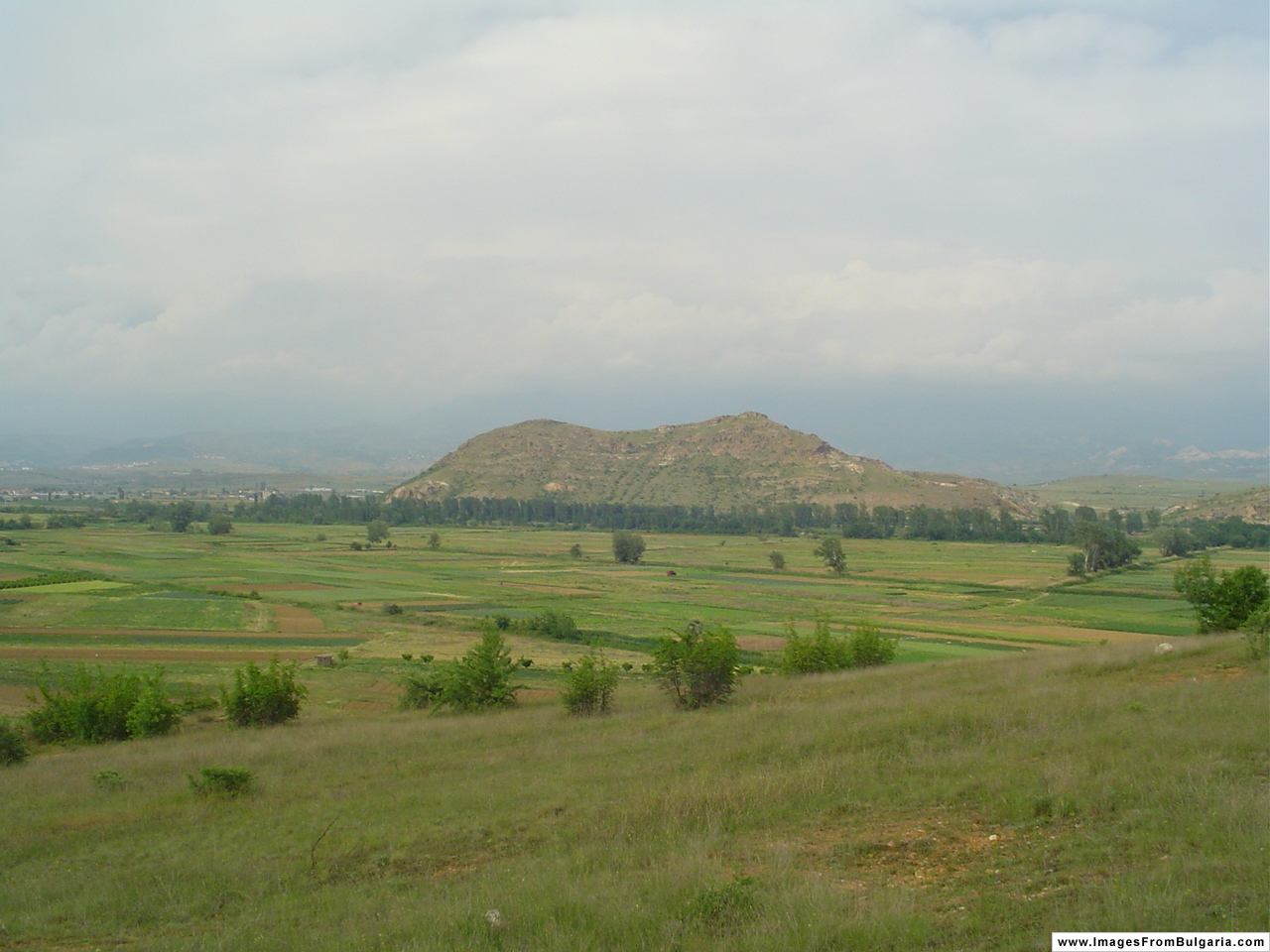
The extinct volcano Kozhuh in the valley

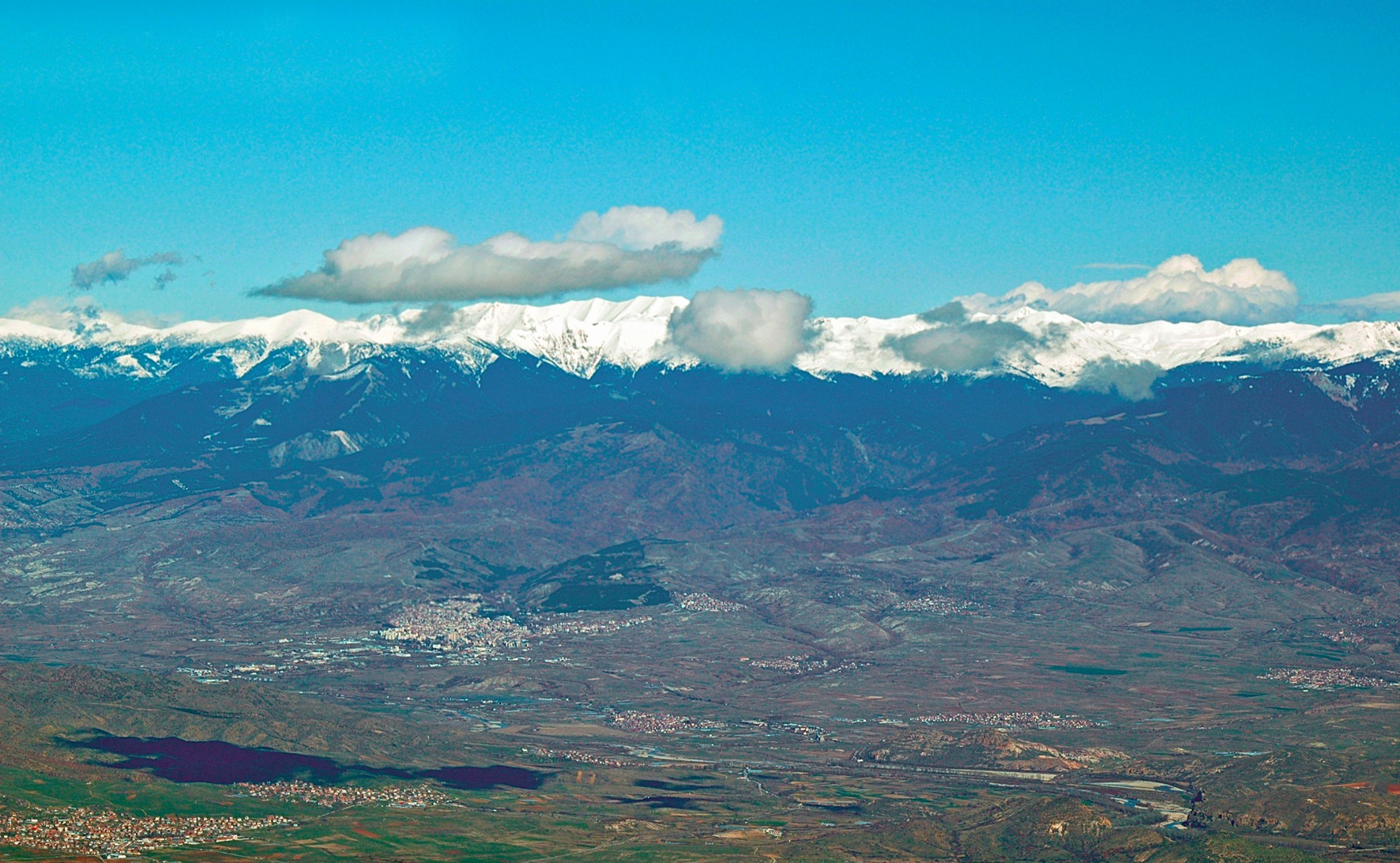
A view of the valley with snow-capped Pirin

The average altitude is about 200 m. The total area of Sandanski–Petrich Valley is about 550 km^{2}. Its maximum length is 42 km and its width reaches 13 km. It is divided into the larger Sandanski Valley to the east and the smaller Petrich valley to the west. Between these two sections is situated the eroded extinct volcano Kozhuh, which raises nearly 200 m above the riverbed of the Struma.

Geologically, the formation of the valley began in the early the Tertiary by graben-like subsidence. During the Pliocene, an extensive freshwater basin was formed, which drained through the Quaternary. It is segmented by numerous small valleys and the extinct volcano Kozhuh. In its southern reaches is situated the small Marikostinovo Gorge formed between two elevations along the Struma. The extensive floodplain of the Sandanski–Petrich Valley is in some places swampy. The two main valleys along the rivers Struma and Strumeshnitsa have wide alluvial bottoms. In the northern part, at the foothills of Maleshevo mountain range there are deposits of fluorite.

=== Climate and hydrology ===
The valley has a humid subtropical climate and is among the warmest regions of Bulgaria. It has the highest average annual temperatures in the country — 16.3 °C in Sandanski and 15.5 °C in Petrich. The average January temperature in Sandanski is 3 °C and in Petrich — 4 °C; average July temperature in Sandanski is 28.6 °C and Petrich — 27.0 °C. The annual amount of precipitation is 527.3 mm in Sandanski and 471 mm in Petrich, with the maximum in winter, making the region among the driest in Bulgaria. The snow cover lasts only a few days.

Sandanski–Petrich Valley is drained by the Struma river and its numerous tributaries from the surrounding mountain ranges, including left tributaries such as: Vlahina reka, Sandanska Bistritsa, Melnishka reka, Pirinska Bistritsa, and right tributaries, such as Tsaparevska reka, Lebnitsa and Strumeshnitsa. Significant amounts of groundwater are formed in the alluvial cones at the bottom of the valley. Numerous mineral springs gush along the surrounding faults, along which the valley has sunk — near Sandanski, Levunovo, Marikostinovo, Rupite and Petrich.

== Nature ==
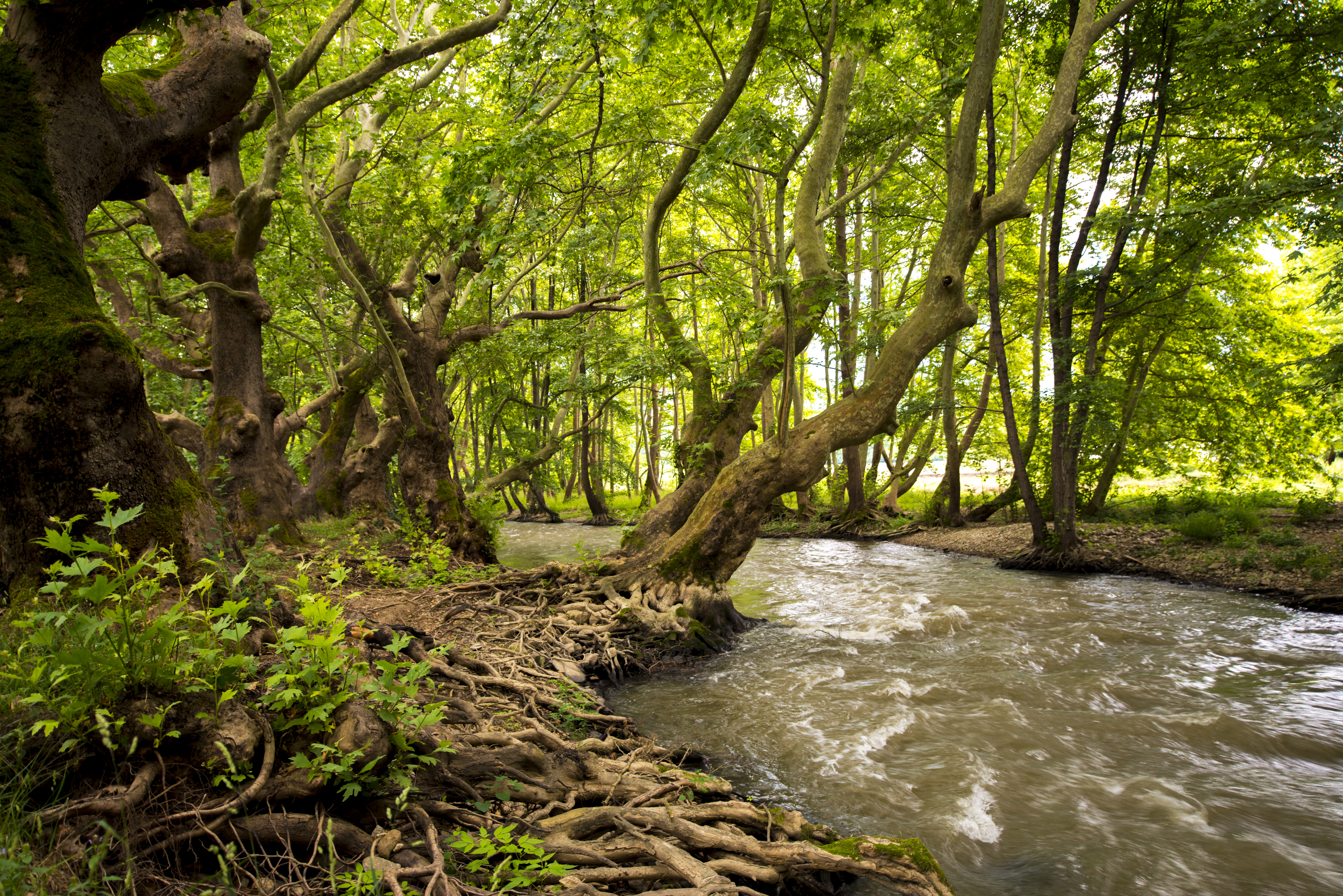
Hydrophilous trees along the Strumeshnitsa

Although most of the valley's territory is arable land under intensive cultivation, it is nonetheless an important biodiversity hotspot in Bulgaria due to the strong Mediterranean influence. The banks of the rivers Struma and Strumeshnitsa are dominated by hydrophilous trees, including some of the most significant natural woodlands of Oriental plane (Platanus orientalis) in Bulgaria, European black alder (Alnus glutinosa), silver poplar (Populus alba) and white willow (Salix alba). Sandanski–Petrich Valley is the only place of Bulgaria where plant species such as dragon lily (Dracunculus vulgaris) or wild almond (Prunus webbii) may be found.

The fauna is diverse with many animal species. Mammals include gray wolf, Eurasian otter, marbled polecat and numerous bat species. The avifauna includes numerous nesting species, and in addition the valley is situated on one of the most important bird migration routes in the country. Typical birds of conservation importance include Levant sparrowhawk, short-toed snake eagle, white stork, pygmy cormorant, masked shrike, lesser grey shrike, olive-tree warbler, many of them with restricted range in Southeast Europe. Sandanski–Petrich Valley is among Bulgaria's most important herpetofauna regions, including all four land and freshwater turtles species in the country, as well as most of the autochthonous snake and lizard species. The area and its surroundings are Bulgaria's only habitat of four-lined snake, and hold important populations of other range-restricted species in the country, such as European ratsnake, European cat snake, eastern Montpellier snake, Dahl's whip snake and European blind snake.

== Settlements, economy and transportation ==
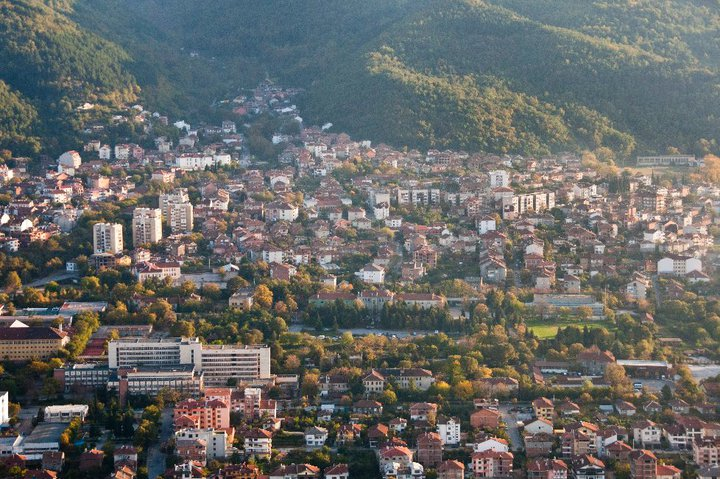
A view of Petrich

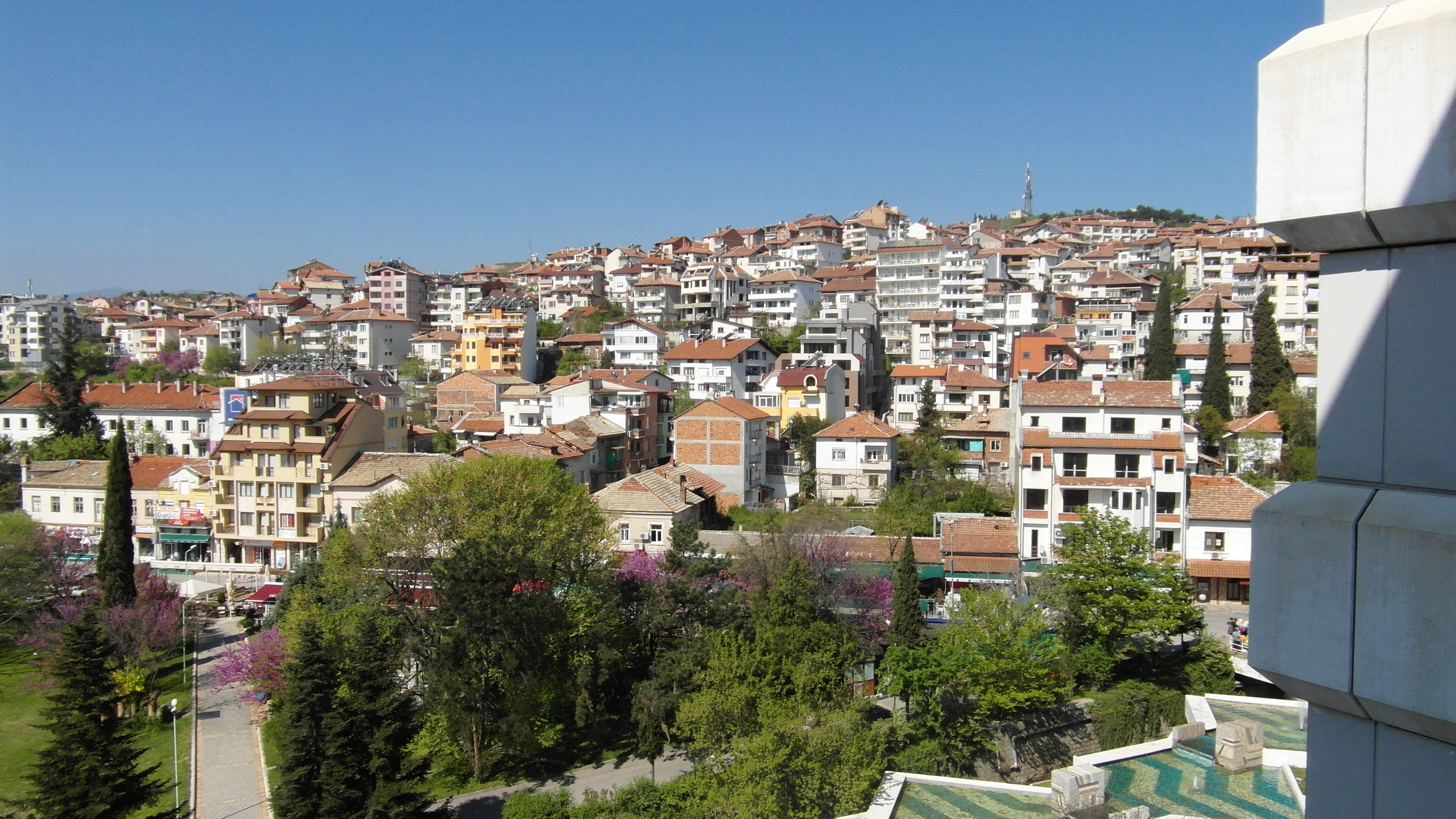
A view of Sandanski

The valley is densely populated and has a dense network of settlements that includes three towns and 53 villages in four municipalities — Kresna, Petrich, Sandanski and Strumyani. The three towns are Sandanski (pop. 24,682 as of 2021), Petrich (26,778) and Kresna (3,267).

The region is served by several roads of the national network, as well as numerous local roads. The valley lies on the strategic route from the capital Sofia to Thessaloniki on the Aegean Sea, which is served by a 32 km section of the Struma motorway and 47 km section of the first class I-1 road between Kresna to the north and Kulata at the border with Greece to the south, both part of European route E79. The second most important road bisects the valley along 53 km from the Zlatarevo border crossing with the Republic of North Macedonia to the west, to the village of Katuntsi to the east, continuing to the town of Gotse Delchev in the Mesta valley further east. Railway line No. 5 operated by the Bulgarian State Railways runs in parallel to the I-1 road along the Struma river; a short railway branches off at the village of General Todorov at the direction of Petrich.

The mild Mediterranean climate of the Sandanski–Petrich Valley favours intensive agriculture, with orchards, vineyard, vegetable gardens and greenhouses. Important commercial crops include grapes, peaches, kiwis, figs, peanuts, anise and tobacco. The manufacturing industry in centred at Petrich and Sandanski, the leading sectors being machine-building, food industry and textiles. The most important spa resort in the valley is Sandanski, whose 11 mineral springs with a total discharge of 1200 L/min and temperature of 33 °C to 83 °C have been utilised since Antiquity. The valley is among the gateways to numerous hiking trails in the Pirin mountain range to the northeast, as well as to the Melnik Earth Pyramids. The important ancient city of Heraclea Sintica is situated near the village of Rupite.

== Sources ==
- Мичев (Michev), Николай (Nikolay); Михайлов (Mihaylov), Цветко (Tsvetko); Вапцаров (Vaptsarov), Иван (Ivan); Кираджиев (Kiradzhiev), Светлин (Svetlin) (1980). Географски речник на България [Geographic Dictionary of Bulgaria] (in Bulgarian). София (Sofia): Наука и култура (Nauka i kultura).
- Душков (Dushkov), Добри (Dobri) (1972). Пирин. Туристически речник [Pirin. Tourist Dictionary] (in Bulgarian). София (Sofia): Наука и култура (Nauka i kultura).
