= Lebnitsa (river) =

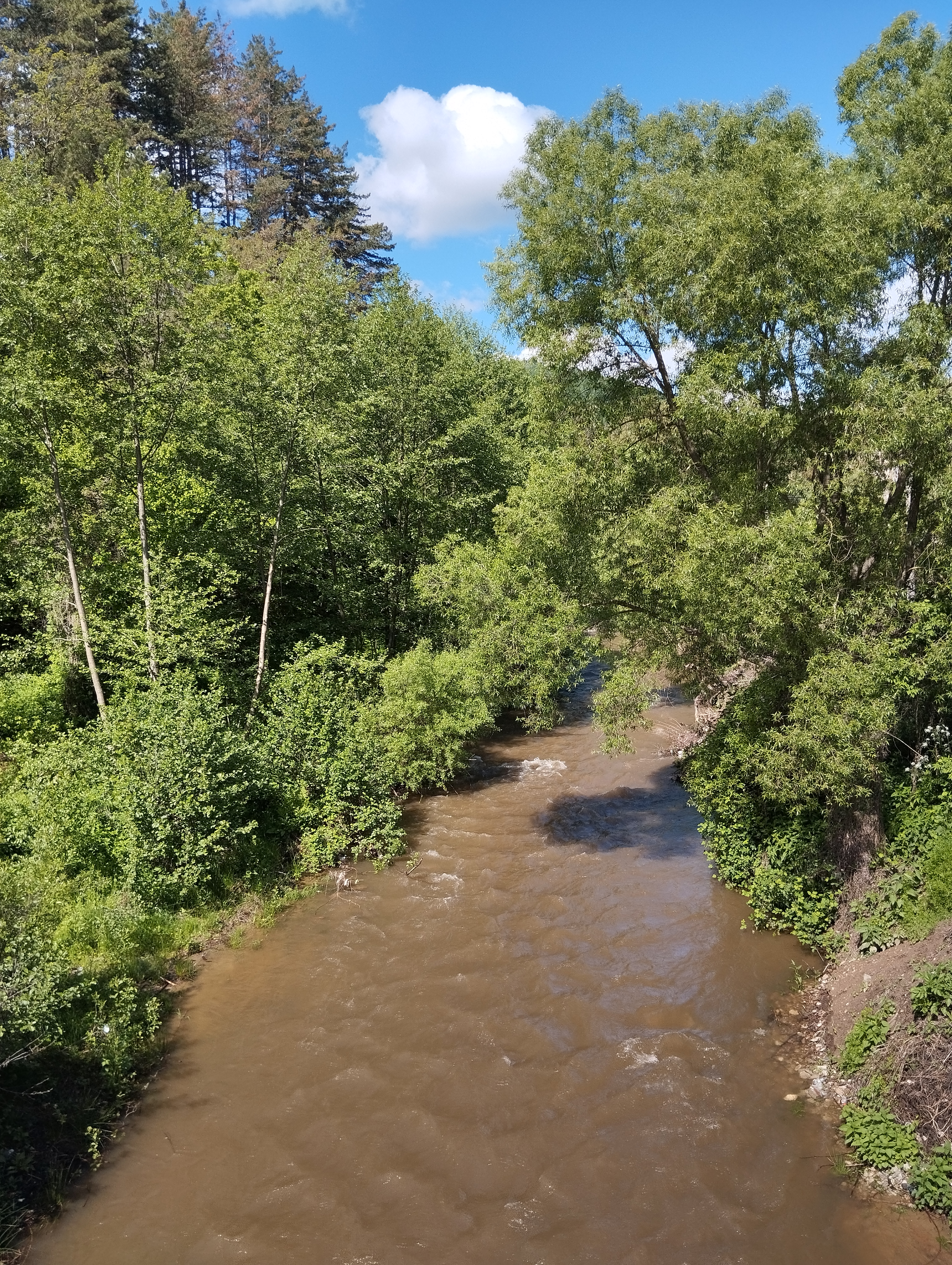
- View from the Lebnitsa River near the village of Nikudin

Location
- Country: Bulgaria, North Macedonia

Physical characteristics
- Source
  - location: Ograzhden
  - coordinates: 41°31′44.04″N 22°52′59.16″E
  - elevation: 1,480 m (4,860 ft)
- Mouth
  - location: Struma River
  - coordinates: 41°31′54.84″N 23°14′47.04″E
  - elevation: 104 m (341 ft)
- Length: 50 km (31 mi)
- Basin size: 318 km^{2} (123 sq mi)

Basin features
- Progression: Struma→ Aegean Sea

The Lebnitsa (Bulgarian: Лебница) is a river in southwestern Bulgaria and southeastern North Macedonia, a right tributary of the Struma. The river is 50 km long; of them 42 km are in Bulgaria. The Lebnitsa drains part of the southern sections of the Maleshevo Mountain and the northern section of the Ograzhden Mountain, forming the boundary between the two ranges along its whole course.

The river takes its source on the territory of North Macedonia at an altitude of 1,480 m, at about 1.4 km southeast of the summit of Ograzhdenets (1,748 m), the highest in Ograzhden. It flows in eastern direction and after 8 km crosses the border into Bulgaria. On Bulgarian territory the Lebnitsa flows in northeastern direction to the village of Nikudin, where it turns to the southeast to the village of Dragush; following Dragush it turns eastwards. Near the village of Lebnitsa the river enters the Sandanski–Petrich Valley, forming an extensive alluvial cone. It flows into the Struma at an altitude of 104 m near the industrial zone of the town of Sandanski. Its river valley is deeply incised in metamorphic rocks and granites, forming numerous meanders. The slopes of its valley are ofter heavily deforested and eroded.

Its drainage basin covers a territory of 318 km^{2} or 1.84% of Struma's total.

The Lebnitsa has predominantly rain-snow feed with high water in March and low water in August. The average annual flow at its mouth is 2.64 m^{3}/s; the maximum flow is 101 m^{3}/s.

There is one settlement along the river, the village of Nikudin in Strumyani Municipality, Blagoevgrad Province. The river's waters are utilised for irrigation. Fish species include Struma barbel, common nase and common chub. Along its left banks in Maleshevo Mountains on Bulgarian territory is situated Sokolata nature reserve, established to protect old-growth Quercus frainetto forests.
