= Andon Zlatarev =

Bulgarian Revolutionary(1872-1902)

Andon Hristov Zlatarev
- Андон Златарев
- Born: 1872; Ohrid, Ottoman Empire (Now North Macedonia)
- Died: March 26, 1902 (aged 30); Grljani, Ottoman Empire (Now North Macedonia)
- Cause of death: Gunshot wound
- Other names: Ivan/Gorov Todorov Zlaterev
- Occupation: Revolutionary
- Years active: 1896−1902
- Organization: Internal Macedonian-Edirne Revolutionary Organization(IMRO)
- Movement: IMRO
- Father: Hristo Kuvendzhiya
- Relatives: Krastyu Zlatarev

Andon Hristov Zlatarev, under the name Ivan or Gorov Todorov Zlaterev, was a Bulgarian revolutionary, an activist of the Internal Macedonian-Adrianople Revolutionary Organization (IMARO).

== Biography ==
Andon Zlatarev was born in 1872 in the city of Ohrid in Ottoman Empire-controlled. He received his primary education in his hometown and later went to recently freed Bulgaria with his brother Krastyu Zlatarev, who was later an officer for the Bulgarian Armed Forces. He studied at an American school in Sofia. After graduating, he worked as a telegraph and post clerk in Kyustendil, where he decided to join the IMRO. In 1896, at the suggestion of Gotse Delchev, Zlatarev, as a postal employee, stole BGN 20,000 from the cash register. The money was earmarked for the needs of the IMRO, but was not subsequently found.

In 1899 he was sent by the Bitola District Committee to Cyril Parlichev in Edessa to help develop the revolutionary cause in the Voden region. He tried to organize a bombardment in Sarakinoi, but failed to do so. He became a teacher in Sarakinovo with the testimony of Dimitar Hristov from Valkoyanevo and under his name. He then worked as a teacher and organizer of IMRO in Sarakinovo for two years.

=== Death ===
During the Thessaloniki affair In the beginning of 1901, in order not to be arrested, the Thessaloniki affair became illegal, he fled to Thessaloniki and joined Ivan Savov's detachment. The whole detachment was killed in a battle with a Turkish army on March 26, 1902, near the village of Grljani.
