= Petrich =

Petrich Петрич
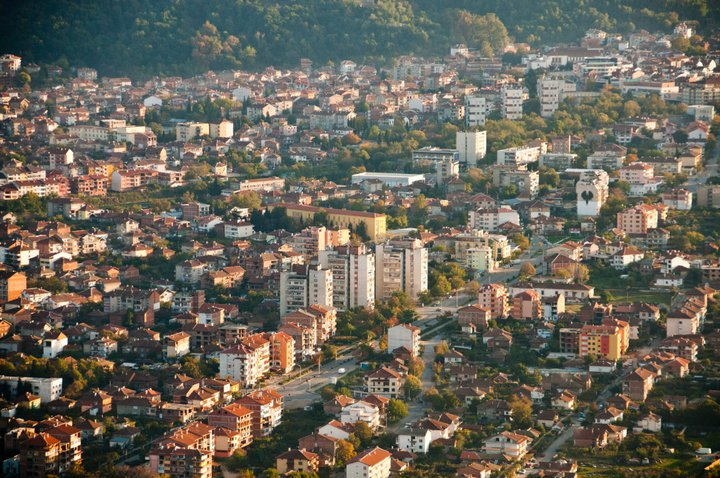

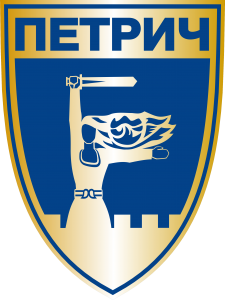
- Coat of arms

- Location of Petrich
- Coordinates: 41°23′43″N 23°12′25″E
- Country: Bulgaria
- Province (Oblast): Blagoevgrad

Government
  - Mayor: Dimitar Bruchkov

Area
  - Total: 80.421 km^{2} (31.051 sq mi)
- Elevation: 168 m (551 ft)

Population (2021)
  - Total: 26,778
  - Density: 332.97/km^{2} (862.40/sq mi)
- Time zone: UTC+2 (EET)
  - Summer (DST): UTC+3 (EEST)
- Postal Code: 2850
- Area code: (+359) 0745
- Website: Official website

Petrich (Bulgarian: Петрич [ˈpɛtrit͡ʃ]) is a town in Blagoevgrad Province in southwestern Bulgaria, located in Sandanski–Petrich Valley at the foot of the Belasica Mountains in the Strumeshnitsa Valley. According to the 2021 census, the town has 26,778 inhabitants.

It is the seat of Petrich Municipality.

Petrich is located close to the borders with Greece and North Macedonia. The crossing into North Macedonia is known as Novo Selo-Petrich, as the first settlement across the border is Novo Selo.

Petrich Peak on Livingston Island in the South Shetland Islands, Antarctica is named for Petrich.

== History ==
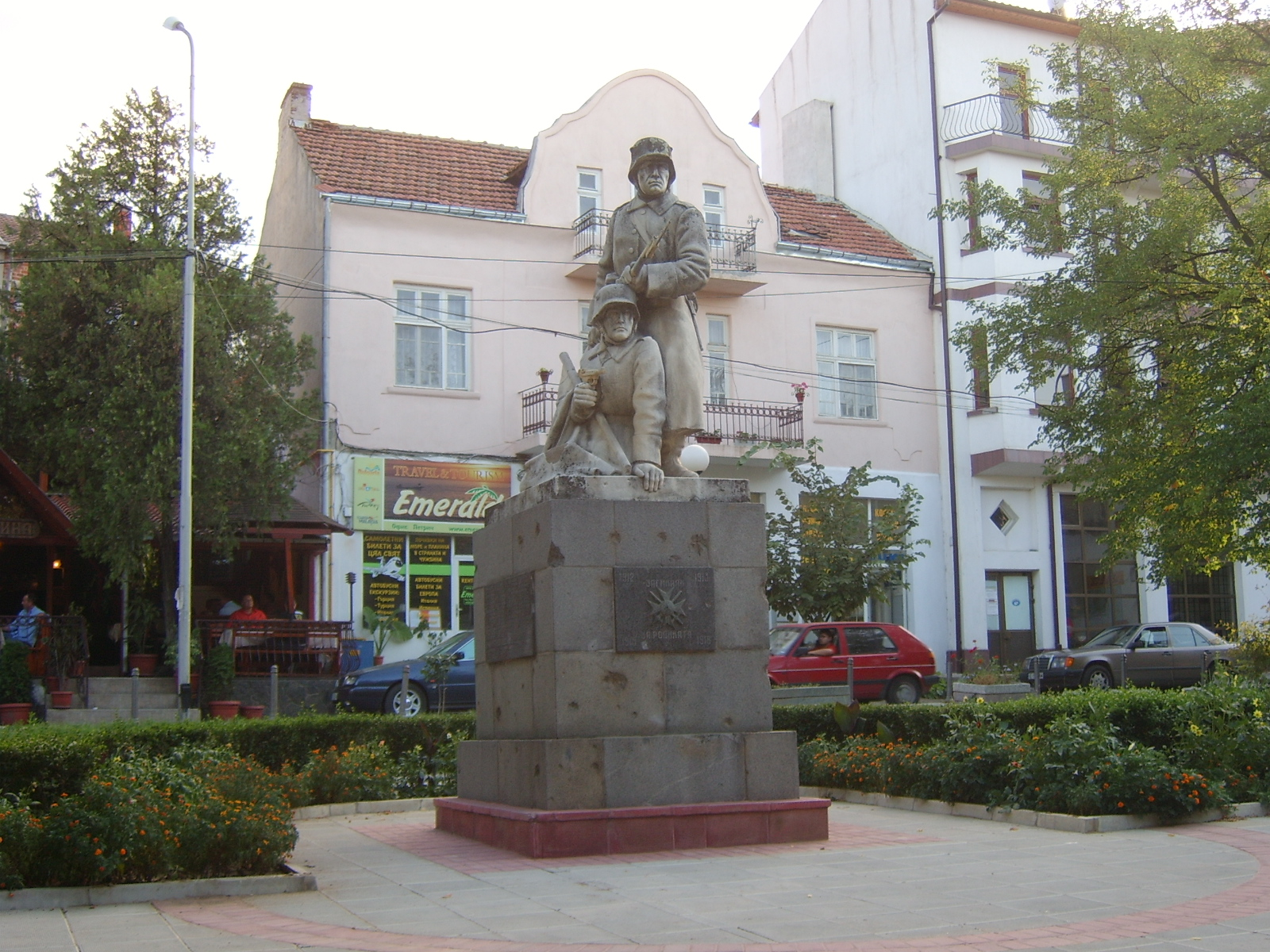
World War I memorial

Petrich was included in the territory of the Bulgarian State during the reign of Knyaz Boris I (r. 852–889). During the Middle Ages it was a Bulgarian fortress of importance during Tsar Samuil's wars (r. 997–1014) with Byzantium. During Ottoman rule, it formed part of the Rumeli Eyalet, and in the 19th century became a kaza of the Sanjak of Serres in the Salonica Vilayet. From 19 January 1892, Petrich and its district were included in the Bulgarian Exarchate, before being included in Bulgaria following the Balkan Wars in 1912–13.

In October 1925 it was the site of a brief conflict between Greece and Bulgaria sometimes called the War of the Stray Dog.

=== Antiquity ===
Petrich is one of the old towns in the valley of the middle Struma. According to local historians, the present-day town of Petrich is the heir to the ancient Thracian settlement located at the southern foot of the Kozhuh hill. In this area, located 10 km northeast of the modern city, in the 4th century BC, a Thracian settlement of the Medi tribe emerged. In the 1st century BC. the Romans conquered the lands of the Medes and then the small settlement near Kozhuh became a well-fortified Roman city - a fortress that protected the middle reaches of the Struma and Rupel gorge. According to the interpretation of the Roman historian Titus Livy, it is assumed that this city was called Petra. Archaeological excavations show that it existed until the 6th century, when it was burned by the Slavs. It is assumed that the remaining living inhabitants left the burned town and settled at the foot of the nearby mountain Belasitsa, which marked the beginning of today's town of Petrich, adding to the old name the Slavic ending "-ich".

Recent archaeological research and the location of the ancient city of Heraclea Sintica in the Kozhuh area prove that there is no continuity between this city, located in the lands of the Thracian Sinti tribe, and modern Petrich, but a hiatus of several centuries. The earliest settlements on the site of the city appear only in the X - XI century. Petrich was formed as a significant settlement and regional center only at the end of the XII - XIV century.

=== The Middle Ages ===
The Petrich region was annexed to the Bulgarian state in 837 as a result of the war of the Bulgarian Khan Presian against Byzantium. At the end of the 10th and the beginning of the 11th century, the lands around Petrich occupied an important military-strategic place in Samuel's state. In 1014, not far from today's town, in the so-called Kleidion gorge, a decisive battle took place between the Bulgarian troops led by Tsar Samuel and the troops of the Byzantine Emperor Basil II. The ruins of Samuel's fortress still remind of the blinding of the captured 14,000 Bulgarian soldiers. For this act the Byzantine emperor Basil II received the nickname "the Bulgar Slayer".

During the period XII - XIV century Petrich became a strong fortress - part of the fortification system in southwestern Bulgaria. This is evidenced by the remains of the medieval fortress Gyaur Kalesi, around which the city originally arose. At least in the XIII - XIV century the city consists of two parts - a fortress, i.e. fortified city core and unfortified outer city, but with entrance-exit arteries guarded by towers.

Petrich was first mentioned in written sources in the deeds of the Serbian magnates Jovan Dragaš and Konstantin Dragaš, who in 1376 - 1377 donated local properties to the Russian monastery "St. Pantaleimon" in Mount Athos. The town fell under Ottoman rule after 1395, when together with its surroundings it was included in the Kyustendil Sanjak as a center of independent Nahiyah.

=== In the Ottoman Empire ===
During the years of Ottoman rule, Petrich acquired a Muslim appearance. The Bulgarians fled to the opposite Ograzhden mountain to stay away from the arbitrariness of the Turks. The Ottoman traveler Evliya Çelebi visited Petrich in 1652 and reported that the palanquin had 240 not very well-developed houses with gardens. There are all two neighborhoods with a mosque, a chapel, two inns and only one bathroom. The center is a kaaza with 80 villages. There are 50 shops, which suggests the level of crafts and trade.

=== Revival struggles ===
During the Bulgarian National Revival, Petrich rose to a new life. It fueled a stubborn struggle against Greekism to impose the Bulgarian language in schools and the church. In 1855 a Bulgarian monk from Hilendar was appointed a teacher in the town, who, seeing that no one in Petrich spoke Greek, began teaching in Bulgarian, but was soon dismissed. After 1856 Pancho Popmihov opened a private school, where he taught Greek and Bulgarian. In 1857, with the labor and funds of the entire Christian population of the city, the Church of the Assumption was built. A service in Greek was introduced in the temple, and a Greek school was opened in its yard. It is housed in the house of Ivan Popmanolev, donated by his wife to the Church of the Assumption.

In 1868, the construction of the first Bulgarian church "St. Nicholas" was completed, which became the center of the Bulgarian population's struggle against Greek propaganda. In the same year, the first Bulgarian church community was founded in Petrich, which established itself as the main unifying center of the Bulgarians in the Petrich region. With its assistance, in 1873, the first New Bulgarian school was opened by Hierodeacon Agapiy Voinov. In 1876, after the April Uprising, the Bulgarian school was closed, and the Greek silogos sent a free Greek teacher to Petrich.

By virtue of the San Stefano Peace Treaty of 1878, the city entered the borders of the Principality of Bulgaria. According to the clauses of the Berlin Treaty, Petrich was returned to the Ottoman Empire, where it remained until 1912.

In 1882, the school opened its doors, with Kocho Mavrodiev becoming the head teacher in the city. He made great contributions to the development of Bulgarian cultural and educational work in Petrich and the Petrich region. He was the founder of the class and girls' school in the city. On his initiative, on May 11, 1889, the holiday of Slavic writing was celebrated for the first time.

At the beginning of 1892, the majority of Bulgarians in Petrich and the region officially came under the jurisdiction of the Bulgarian Exarchate.

== Geography ==
=== Climate ===
Petrich (2004–2016)

Climate chart (precipitation, max. and min. temperature)
J	F	M	A	M	J	J	A	S	O	N	D
51 10 1	44 11 2	51 16 5	52 21 9	71 26 14	73 31 18	41 34 20	39 34 20	38 28 16	59 22 11	65 16 6	70 10 3
- █ Average max. and min. temperatures in °C
- █ Precipitation totals in mm
Imperial conversion
J	F	M	A	M	J	J	A	S	O	N	D
2 50 34	1.7 52 36	2 61 41	2 70 48	2.8 79 57	2.9 88 64	1.6 93 68	1.5 93 68	1.5 82 61	2.3 72 52	2.6 61 43	2.8 50 37
- █ Average max. and min. temperatures in °F
- █ Precipitation totals in inches

Petrich has a mediterranean climate (Köppen Climate Classification Csa) with an average annual temperature of 15.6 °C (60.1 °F). The town experiences some continental influence, especially in winter, which is cool, but warm for Bulgarian standards.

Petrich is the sunniest city in Bulgaria slightly ahead of Sandanski with yearly sunshine hours exceeding 2,700 on average.

Summer is hot and sunny and it is the longest season in Petrich, lasting from May through September, even as late as October. The average summer temperature is around 25 °C. In July, the sunniest month, Petrich receives 373 hours of sunshine, making it one of the sunniest places in Continental Europe. Winter season, around two months, starts in late December and lasts until early February. Average winter temperature is one of the highest in the country with average around 5 °C. In December, the darkest month, there are 103 hours of sunshine, on average.

Climate table:

Climate data for Petrich (2004–2016)
Month	Jan	Feb	Mar	Apr	May	Jun	Jul	Aug	Sep	Oct	Nov	Dec	Year
Mean daily maximum °C (°F)	9.5 (49.1)	11.1 (52.0)	15.6 (60.1)	20.5 (68.9)	26.0 (78.8)	30.5 (86.9)	33.5 (92.3)	33.5 (92.3)	28.1 (82.6)	21.7 (71.1)	15.5 (59.9)	10.5 (50.9)	21.2 (70.2)
Daily mean °C (°F)	4.0 (39.2)	5.5 (41.9)	10.2 (50.4)	14.8 (58.6)	20.1 (68.2)	24.0 (75.2)	27.0 (80.6)	27.0 (80.6)	22.0 (71.6)	16.1 (61.0)	10.3 (50.5)	5.1 (41.2)	15.5 (59.9)
Mean daily minimum °C (°F)	0.7 (33.3)	1.6 (34.9)	4.5 (40.1)	9.1 (48.4)	14.0 (57.2)	17.5 (63.5)	19.6 (67.3)	19.6 (67.3)	15.5 (59.9)	10.9 (51.6)	5.8 (42.4)	2.6 (36.7)	10.3 (50.5)
Average precipitation mm (inches)	38 (1.5)	38 (1.5)	38 (1.5)	38 (1.5)	48 (1.9)	39 (1.5)	32 (1.3)	28 (1.1)	25 (1.0)	38 (1.5)	59 (2.3)	50 (2.0)	471 (18.5)
Mean monthly sunshine hours	113	139	211	215	286	331	373	344	273	206	147	103	2,733

== Economy ==
The town is an agricultural centre for fruit, vegetables and tobacco. It has three factories, making water level detectors, details for cranes and a furniture factory.

== Broadcasting station ==
Transmitter Petrich is located at 41°28′14″N 23°19′37″E, about 12 kilometres (7 1/2 mi) northeast of the town center and 1.5 kilometres (1 mile) north of Novo Konomladi village. It is a 500 kW mediumwave broadcasting station working on 747 kHz. The antenna is a 205 metres (673 feet) tall guyed mast insulated against ground and equipped with an additional cage antenna. The mast was built in 1977.

== International relations ==
Twin towns – Sister cities

- Serres, Greece

== Gallery ==
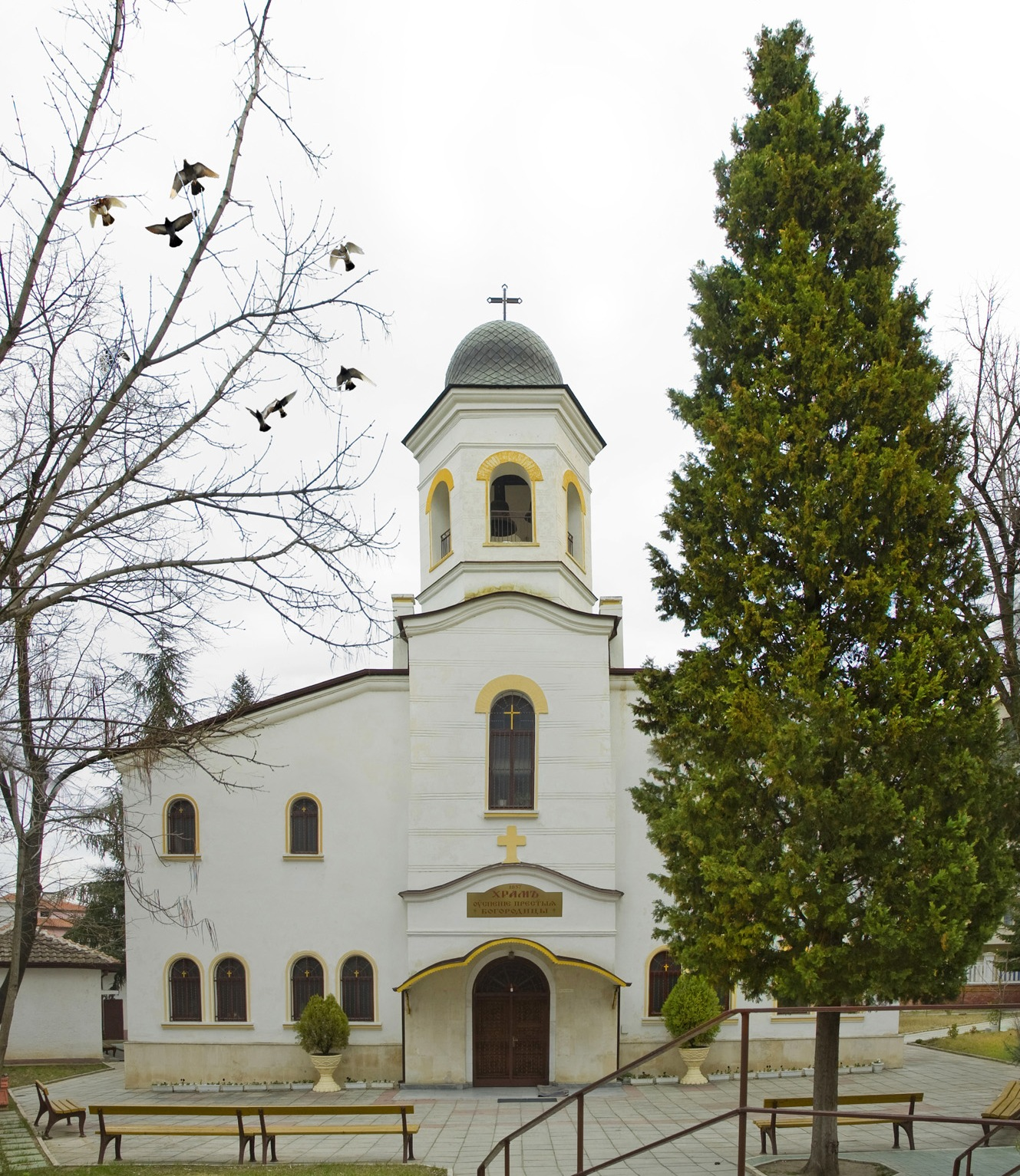
"St Bogoroditsa" Church

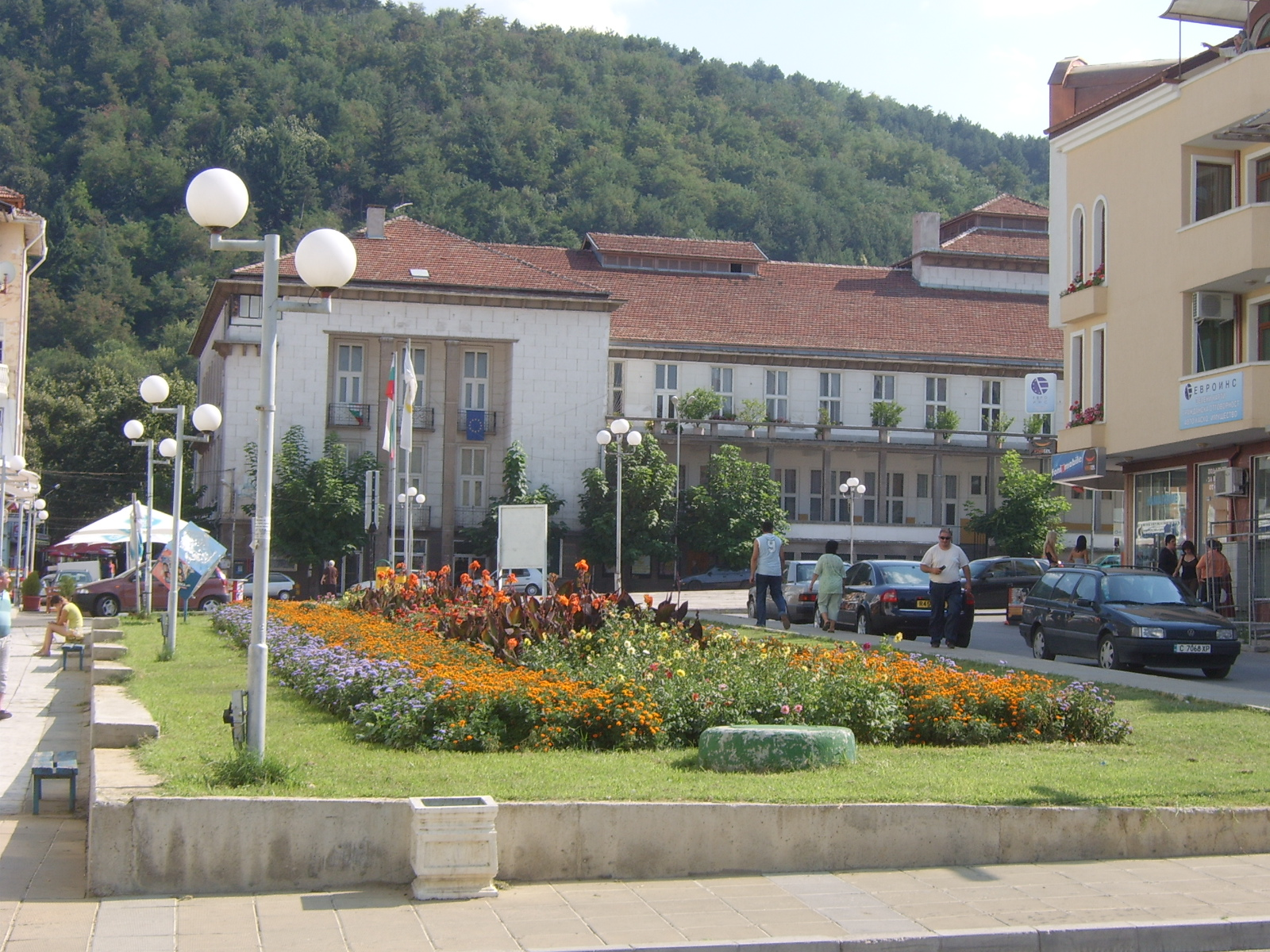
Central Petrich

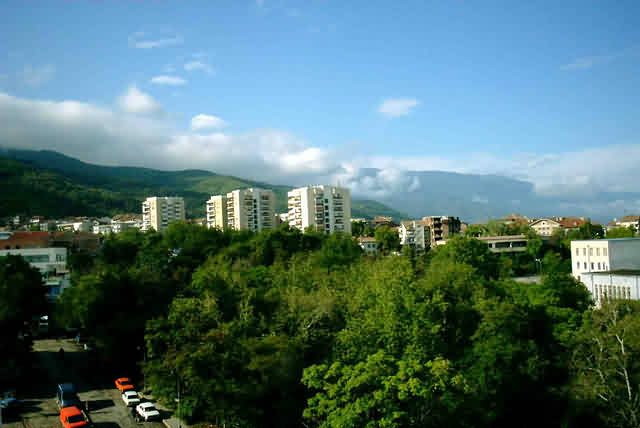
Petrich and Belasica

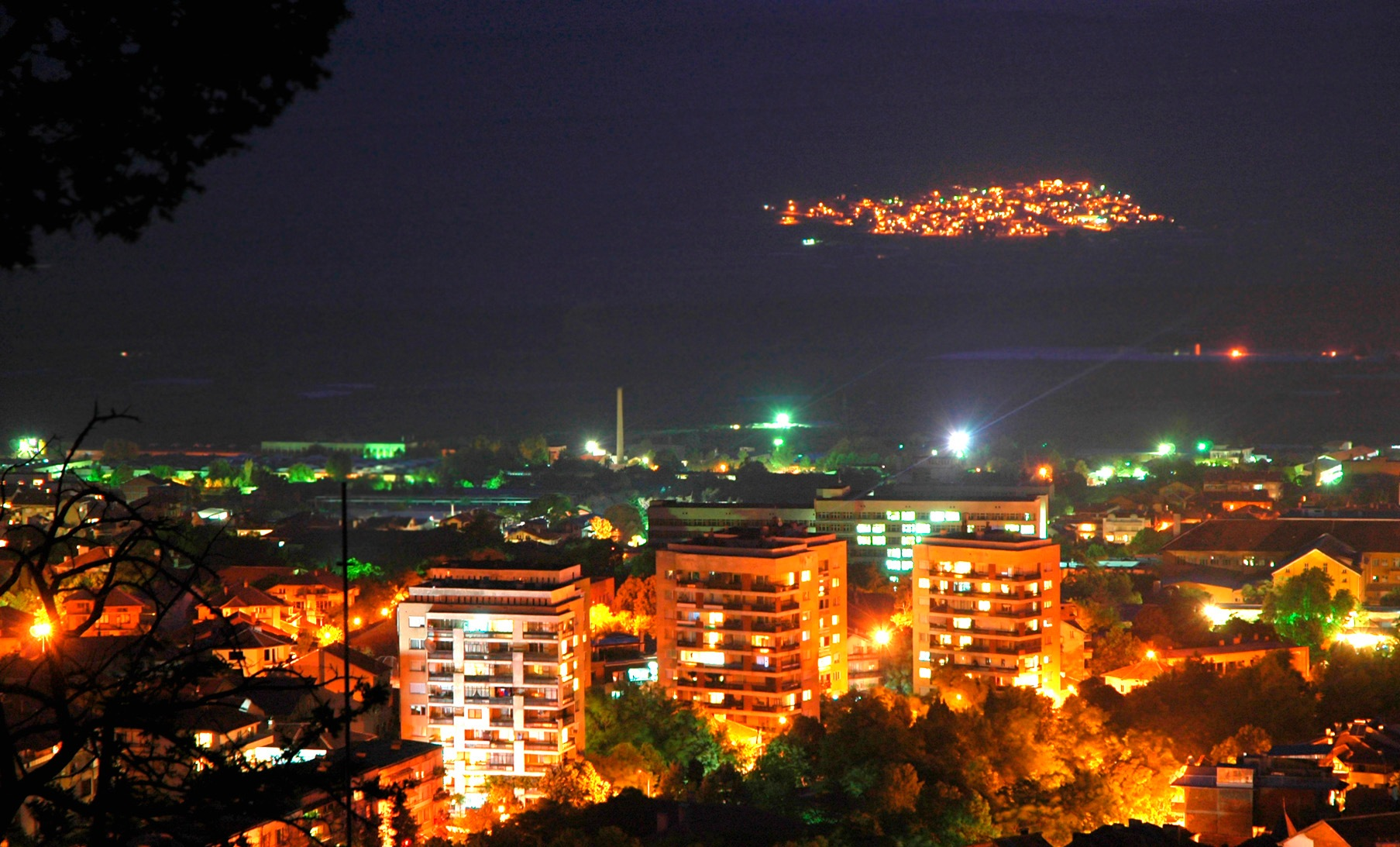
Petrich at night

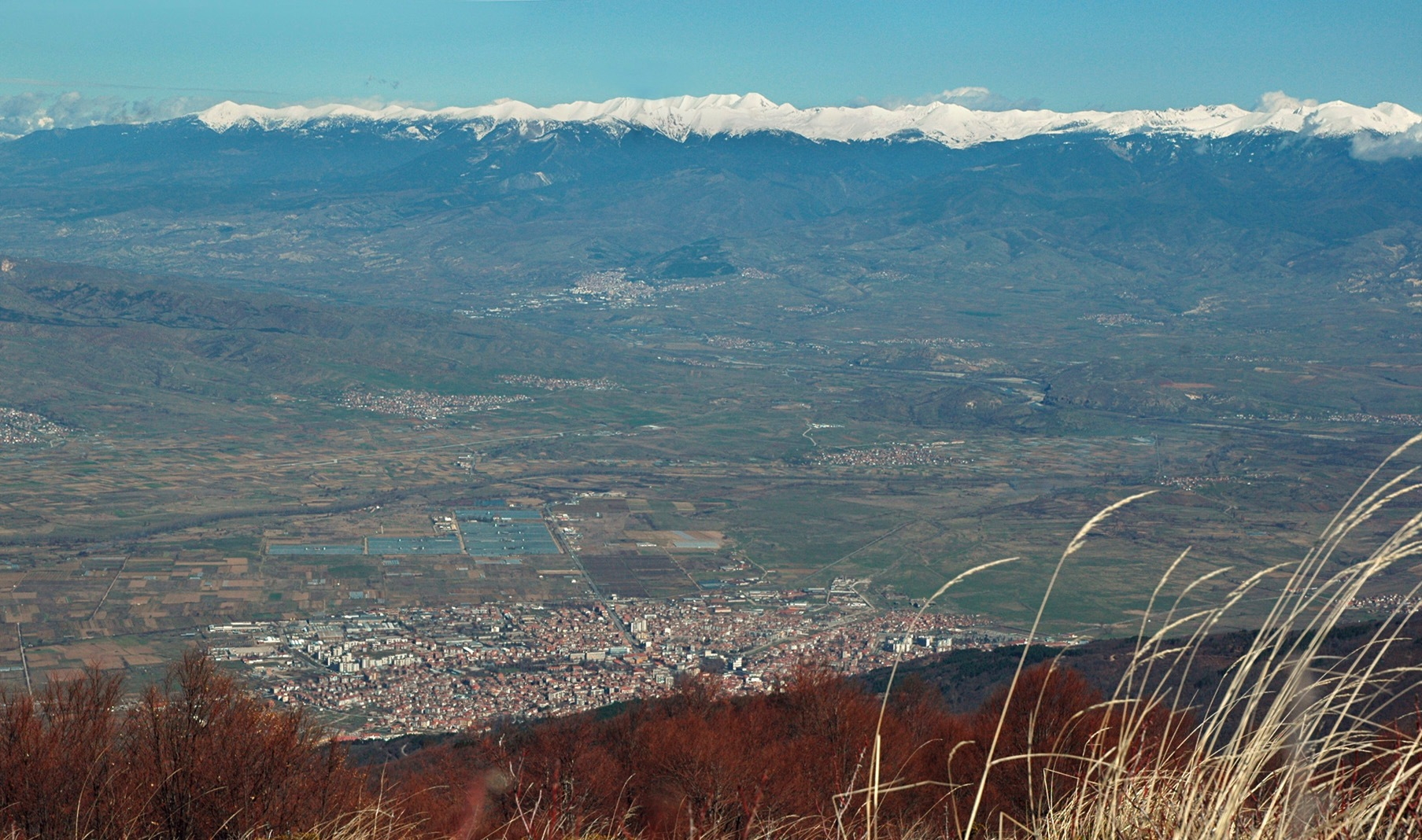
Petrich and Pirin Mountains

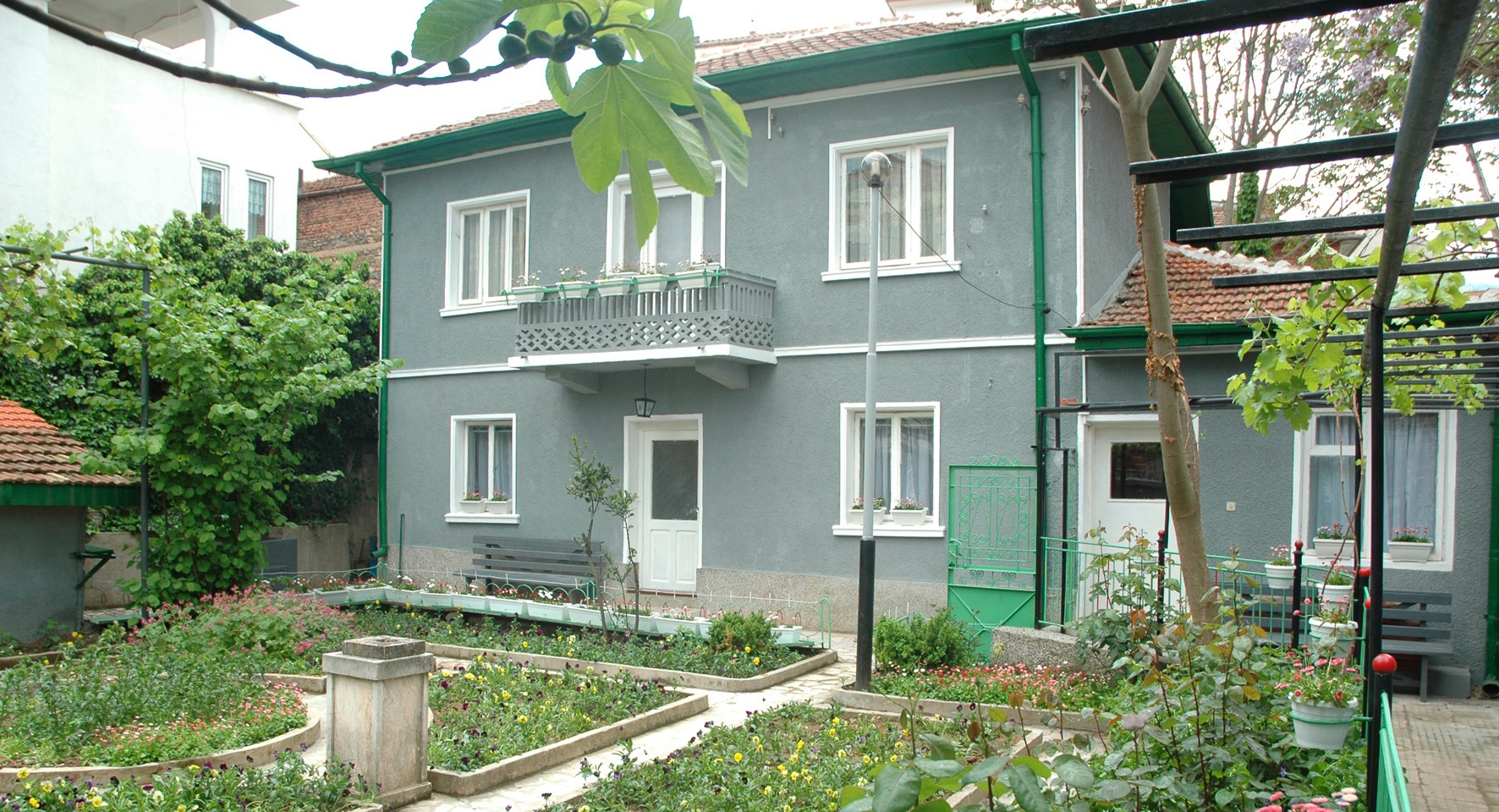
The house of Vanga in Petrich
