= Krastyu Zlatarev =

Bulgarian military officer (1881–1925)

Krastyu Christ Zlatarev
- Кръстю Златарев
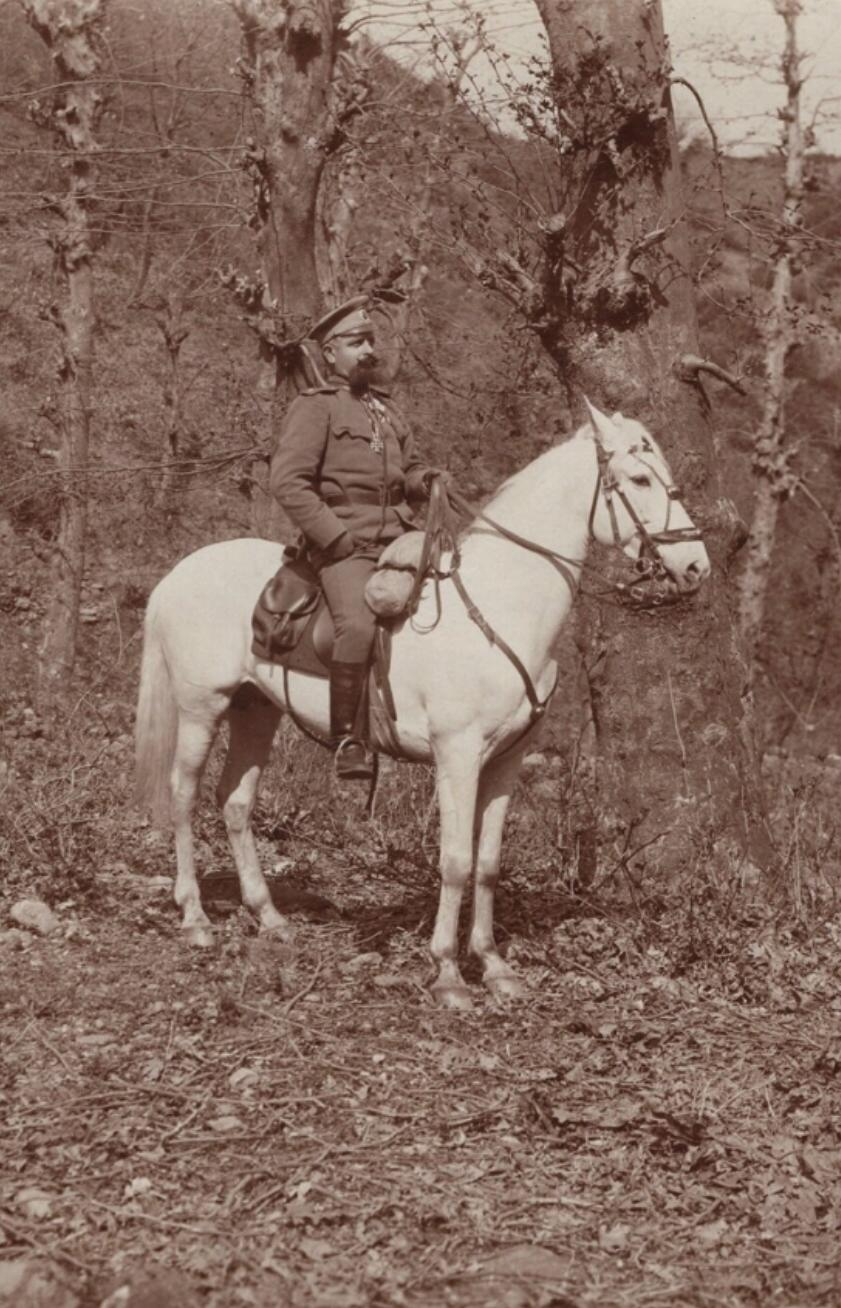
- Major General (Lieutenant General) Krastyu Zlatarev looking ahead as Commander of the 11th Macedonian Infantry Division - 1916
- Born: 23 February 1864; Ohrid, Ottoman Empire (Now North Macedonia)
- Died: 16 April 1925 (aged 61); Sofia, Bulgaria
- Military career
- Allegiance: Bulgaria
- Service years: 1881–1919
- Rank: Lieutenant General
- Commands: 29th Yambol Infantry Regiment; Brigade in the 7th Rila Infantry Division; 11th Macedonian Infantry Division
- Conflicts: Serbo-Bulgarian War; Balkan War; Second Balkan War; World War I
- Awards: 2 orders "For Courage"; 2 orders "St. Alexander"; 1 order "For Military Merit"

Krastyu Christ Zlatarev (Bulgarian: Кръстю Златарев) was a Bulgarian officer, and commanded the 11th Macedonian Infantry Division throughout World War I.

== Biography ==
Krastyu Zlatarev was born on 23 February 1864 in the city of Ohrid. His father was a priest from the District of Koshishta and his brother Andon Zlatarev was a revolutionary from the Internal Macedonian-Edirne Revolutionary Organization but later died in 1903 in conflict. Krastyu Zlatarev enlisted in the Bulgarian Armed Forces on 11 September 1881. He graduated from military school in 1884 and August 30 of that year was promoted to lieutenant and was assigned to the 13th Risa Infantry Regiment of the Bulgarian Armed Forces.

=== Serbo-Bulgarian War ===
In the Serbo-Bulgarian War he was given command of the 3rd Company of the reserves battalion of the 2nd Strumski Infantry Regiment. He fought near Slivnitsa and near Keltash and fought even when wounded. He was awarded the Order of Courage IV degree for these actions.

In 1889 he was promoted to the rank of captain. A year later, on 25 February 1900, he was promoted to major and given command of the 9th Battalion Reserve Regiment. On 27 September 1904 he was promoted to lieutenant colonel. In 1910 he was promoted to colonel. Three years later in 1913 he was then appointed assistant commander of the 12th Balkan Infantry Regiment.

=== Balkan Wars ===
During the First Balkan War he was colonel and commander of the 29th Yambol Infantry Regiment and fought in the Battle of Kirk Kilisse, near the city of Çatalca and participated in the Siege of Odrin. The regiment commanded by him later became famous for taking the Turkish fort, Fort Ileritabia. For his bravery in battle he was awarded the Order "For Courage" III degree.

During the Second Balkan War he fought against the Greeks at Kilkis and Blagoevgrad. In 1914 he became the commander of the brigade in the 7th Rila Infantry Division.

=== First World War ===
Ten days before the mobilization for World War I Zlatarev was appointed commander of the 11th Macedonian Infantry Division. In 1916 he was promoted to Major General. After the war he transferred to the reserve and on 25 June 1919 he was promoted to the rank of lieutenant general.

=== Death ===
Krastyu Zlatarev died in the St Nedelya Church assault on 16 April 1925.

== Memory ==
On behalf of Krastyu Zlatarev a border checkpoint was named Border checkpoint "Zlatarevo", located on the border between Bulgaria and North Macedonia on where in the years 1915 to 1918 was the headquarters of the 11th Macedonian Infantry Division. On 31 July 2014 a memorial plaque in honor of the military leader was unveiled at the Zlatarevo border checkpoint with an official ceremony. The event coincides with the 150th anniversary of his birth and 55 years since the opening of the station.

== Sources ==
- Nedev, S., The Command of the Bulgarian Army during the Wars of National Unification, Sofia, 1993, Military Publishing Complex "St. George the Victorious.
- Compound 1885 - encyclopedic reference book. Sofia, State Publishing House "Dr. Peter Beron", 1985.
- Yotov, Petko, Dobrev, Angel, Milenov, Blagoy. The Bulgarian Army in the First World War (1915 - 1918): A Short Encyclopedic Reference Book. Sofia, Publishing House "St. George the Victorious ", 1995.
