= Nikudin =

- Village
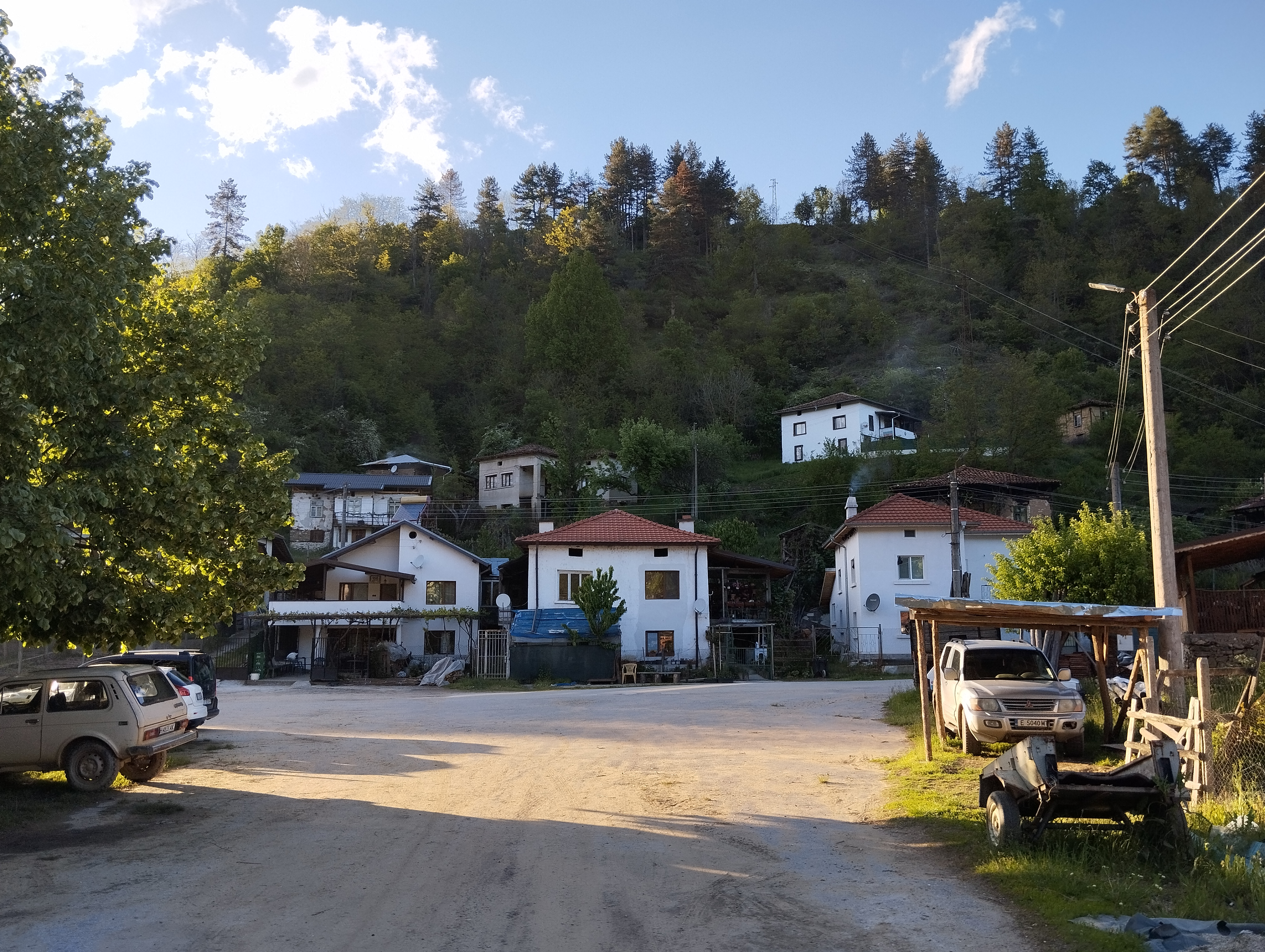

- Location within Bulgaria
- Coordinates: 41°34′N 23°03′E
- Country: Bulgaria
- Province: Blagoevgrad Province
- Municipality: Strumyani Municipality
- Time zone: UTC+2 (EET)
  - Summer (DST): UTC+3 (EEST)

Nikudin is a village in Strumyani Municipality, in Blagoevgrad Province, in southwestern Bulgaria.
