= Novo Selo-Petrich =

Border crossing between North Macedonia and Bulgaria

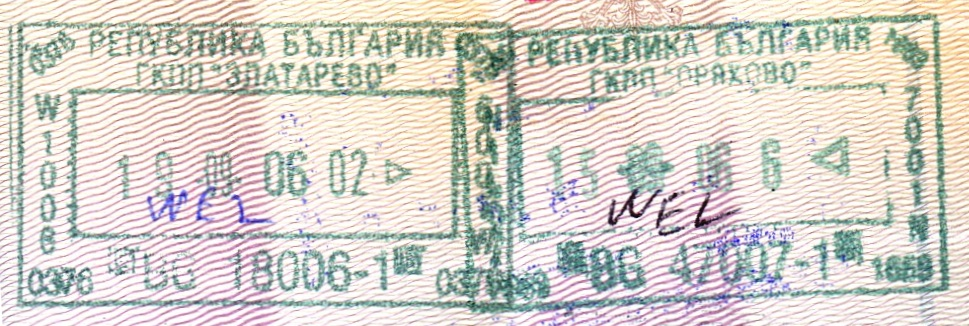
- Border stamp from Zlatarevo border crossing

- Location within Bulgaria Location within North Macedonia
- Coordinates: 41.3966°N 22.96598°E

Novo Selo-Petrich or Zlatarevo (Bulgarian and Macedonian: Ново Село-Петрич, Novo Selo-Petrič) is the southernmost of three international border crossings between North Macedonia and Bulgaria, near Petrich.

The crossing is named after the two closest settlements situated along the road on either side of the frontier: Novo Selo is a nearby Macedonian village in Novo Selo Municipality and Petrich is a small Bulgarian town situated in the Blagoevgrad Province.

This border crossing is the most relaxed since the other two largely link the capitals and the larger cities, and it is also the only crossing point situated on a plain; the other two - Deve Bair (Kriva Palanka-Kyustendil) and Logodazh, formerly Stanke Lisichkovo (Delčevo-Blagoevgrad) - are situated at the peaks of mountains.

== History ==
The border checkpoint is named after the Bulgarian lieutenant general Krastyu Zlatarev (1864 - 1925), Commander of 11th Macedonian Infantry Division. Here, during the First World War, in the years 1915-1918, the headquarters of the division was located.
