= Ograzhden (mountain) =

Mountain in Bulgaria

- Bulgarian: Огражден; Macedonian: Огражден
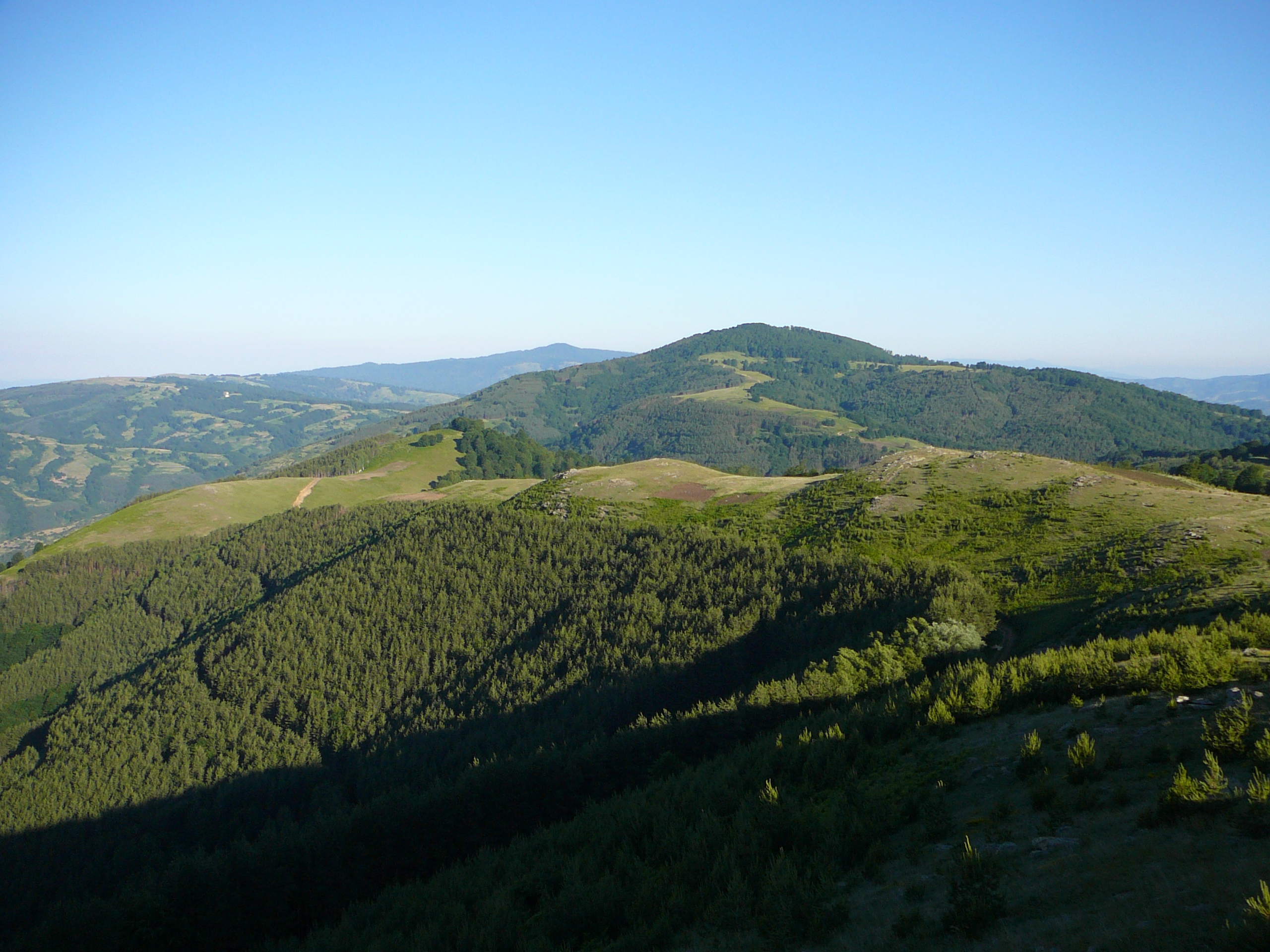
- Ograzhden seen from Bilska Chuka, Bulgaria

Highest point
- Peak: Ograzhdenec
- Elevation: 1,744 m (5,722 ft)
- Coordinates: 41°30′30.96″N 23°0′26.28″E

Geography
- Map of the mountains of Ograzhden (north) and Belasitsa (south)
- Countries: Bulgaria and North Macedonia

Ograzhden (Огражден, pronounced [oˈɡraʒdɛn] in Bulgarian and [ˈɔɡraʒdɛn] in Macedonian) is a mountain range shared by southwestern Bulgaria and southeastern North Macedonia. The highest peak of the mountain is located in North Macedonia, Ograzhdenec (Огражденец) at 1,744 m, while the highest in Bulgaria is Bilska Chuka (Билска чука) at 1,644 m.

== Geography ==
Ograzhden is part of the Belasitsa-Osogovo mountain group. To the north the valley of the river Lebnitsa (right tributary of the Struma) separates it from the Maleshevo Mountain; and to the southwest, south and southeast its slopes descend steeply to the Strumitsa and Sandanski–Petrich Valleys, north of the Belasitsa mountain range. To the west the valley of the river Turia (left tributary of Strumeshnitsa) separates it from Dragolevska Mountain. East of the Struma river lies the Pirin mountain range. The main ridge of Ograzhden stretches from west to east for about 50 km, and its width reaches 17 km.

The main mountain ridge is wide and flat with an average altitude of 1200 m and is stemmed by a number of secondary ridges. The highest summit of the mountain is Ograzhdenec at 1744 m, located in North Macedonia, about 3 km west of the border. In the Bulgarian part the highest peak is Bilska Chuka 1644 m, about 2 km north of the village of Baskaltsi. To the east-southeast of the summit rises the peak Markovi Kladentsi (1523 m) with a panoramic view in all directions. Other summits include: Golak (1639 m), Muratov Vrah (1398 m) and Kukovski Chukar (1233 m).

Ograzhden is formed by broken metamorphic rocks — gneiss and various types of schists, which are easily susceptible to weathering and erosion. At its southern foothills there are deluvial deposits with a thickness of 10—20 m.

== Climate and water ==
The climate of the mountain is transitional Mediterranean. Its whole territory falls into the catchment area of the river Struma. The northern slopes are drained by small and short right tributaries of the river Lebnitsa; the eastern by streams flowing directly into the Struma; and southern and western are drained by left tributaries of the river Strumeshnitsa.

== Trivia ==
Ograzhden Cove in Livingston Island in the South Shetland Islands, Antarctica is named after Ograzhden Mountain.

== Gallery ==
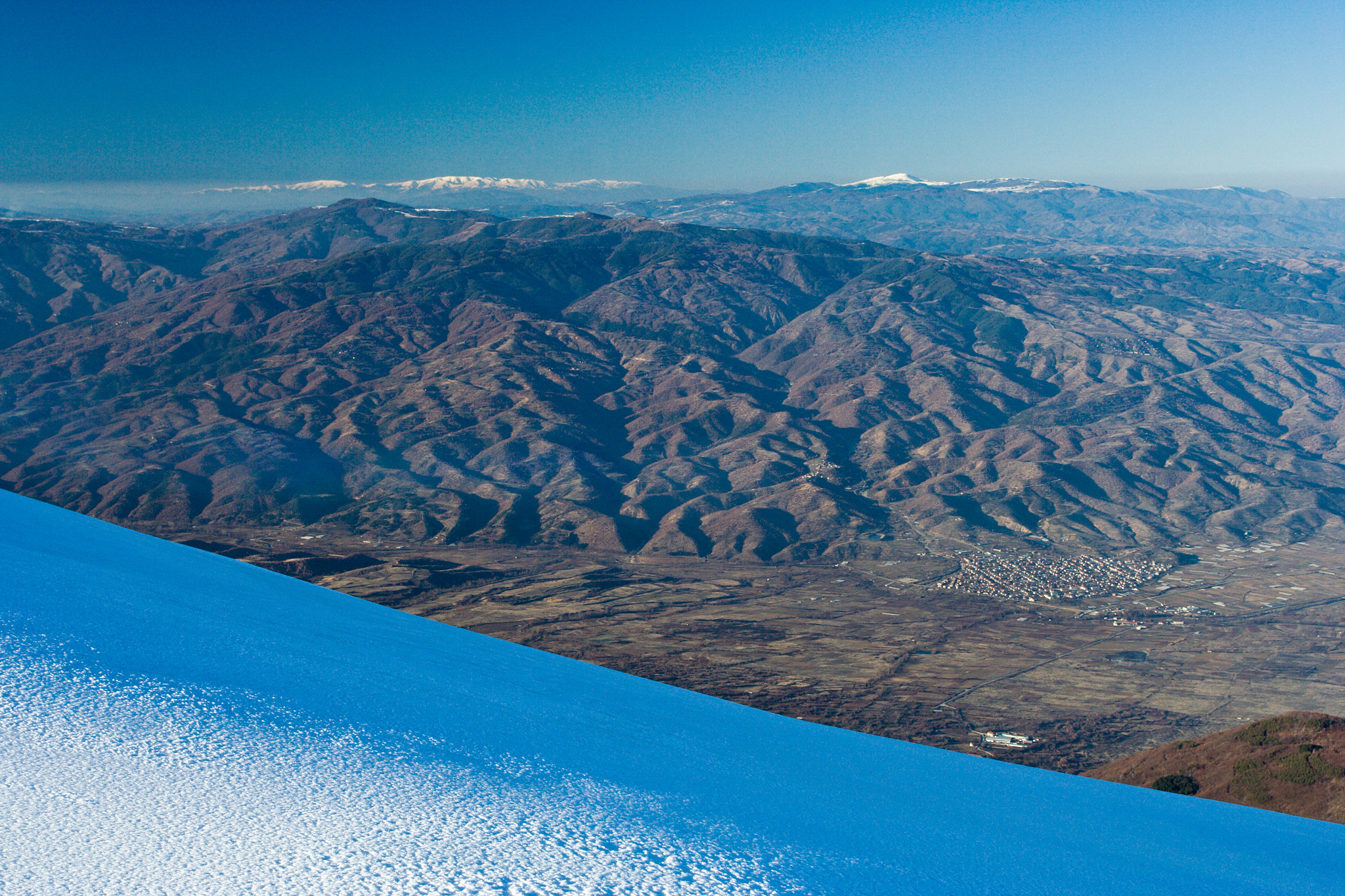
View of Ograzhden from Belasitsa, Bulgaria

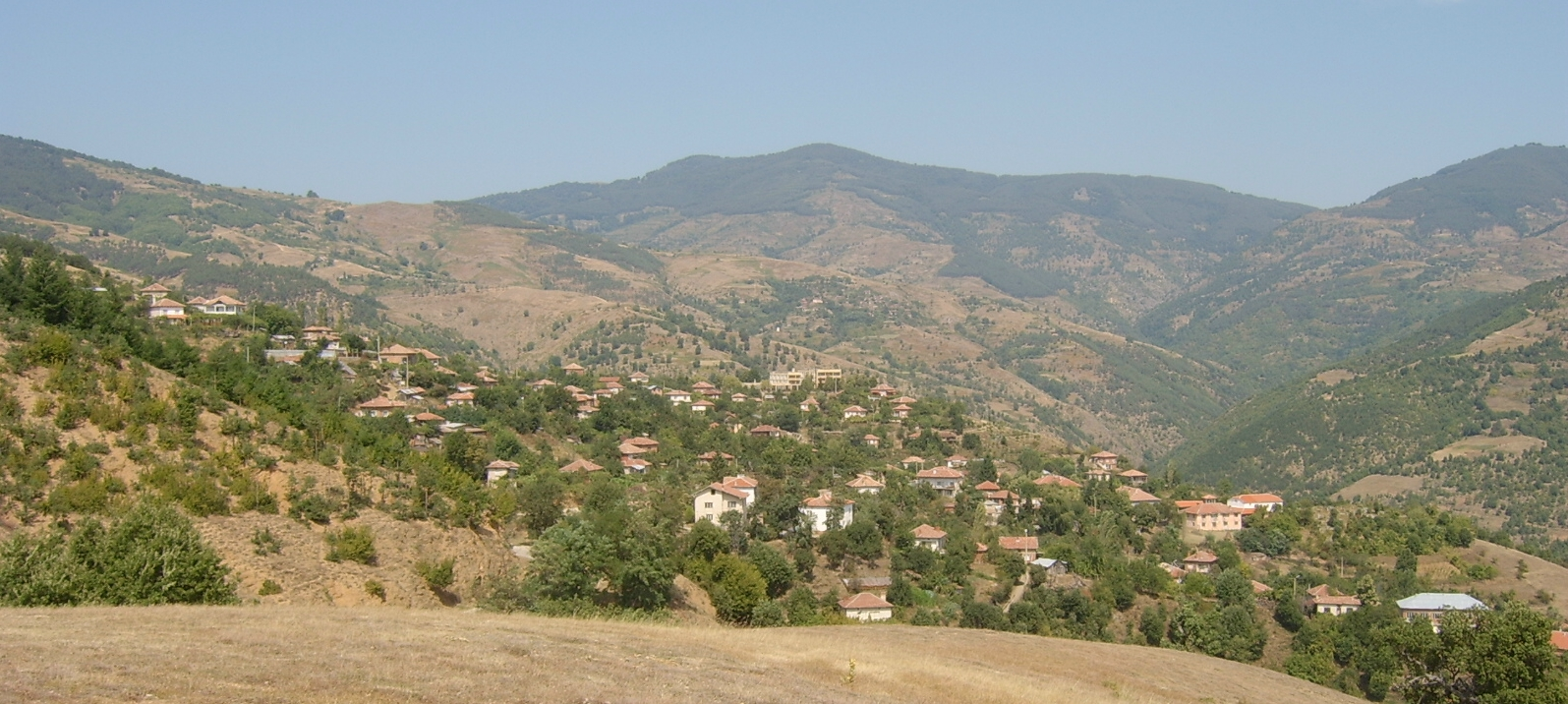
Village of Gega, Bulgaria in Ograzhden

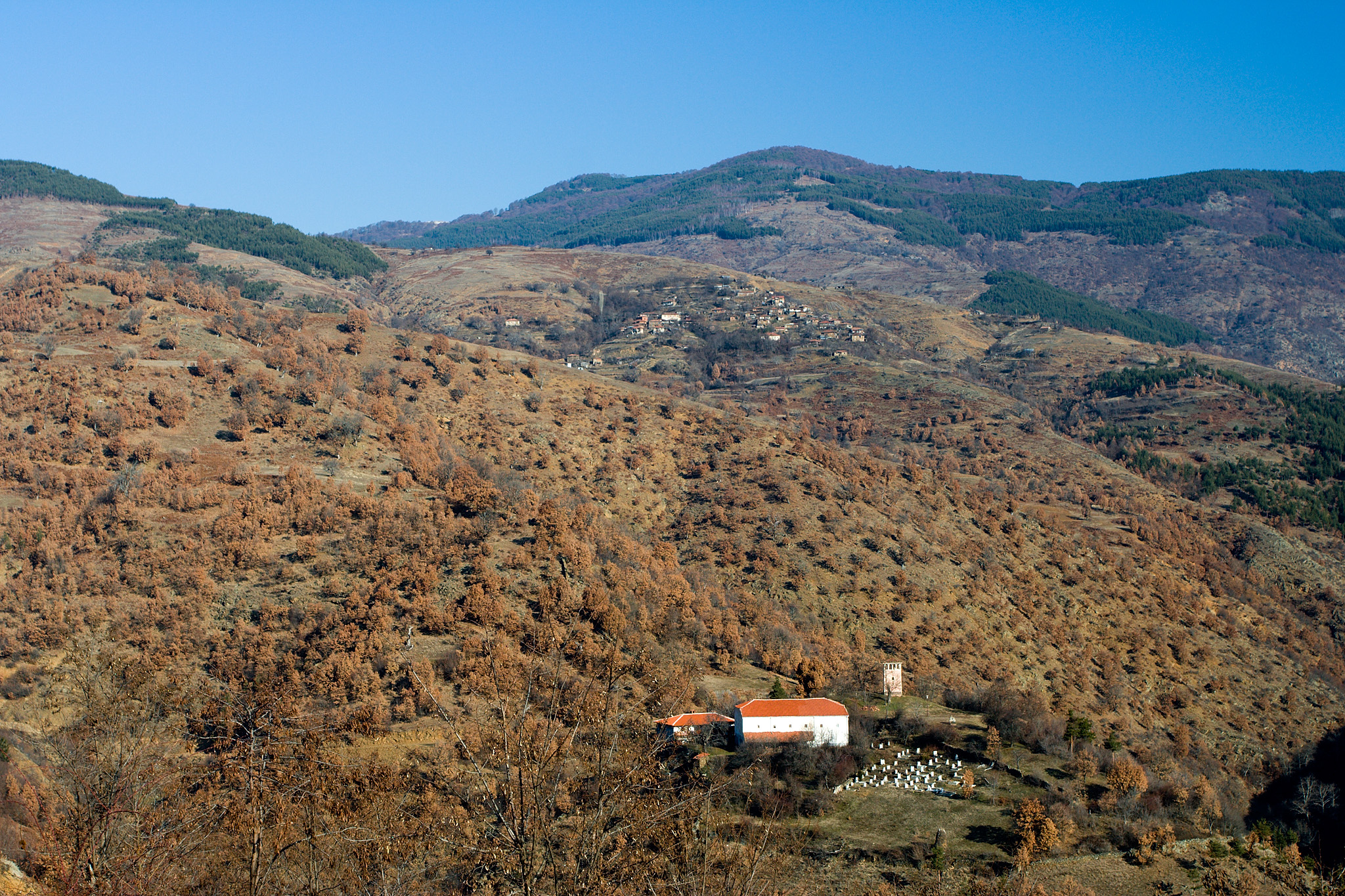
Churilovo Monastery in Ograzhden, Bulgaria

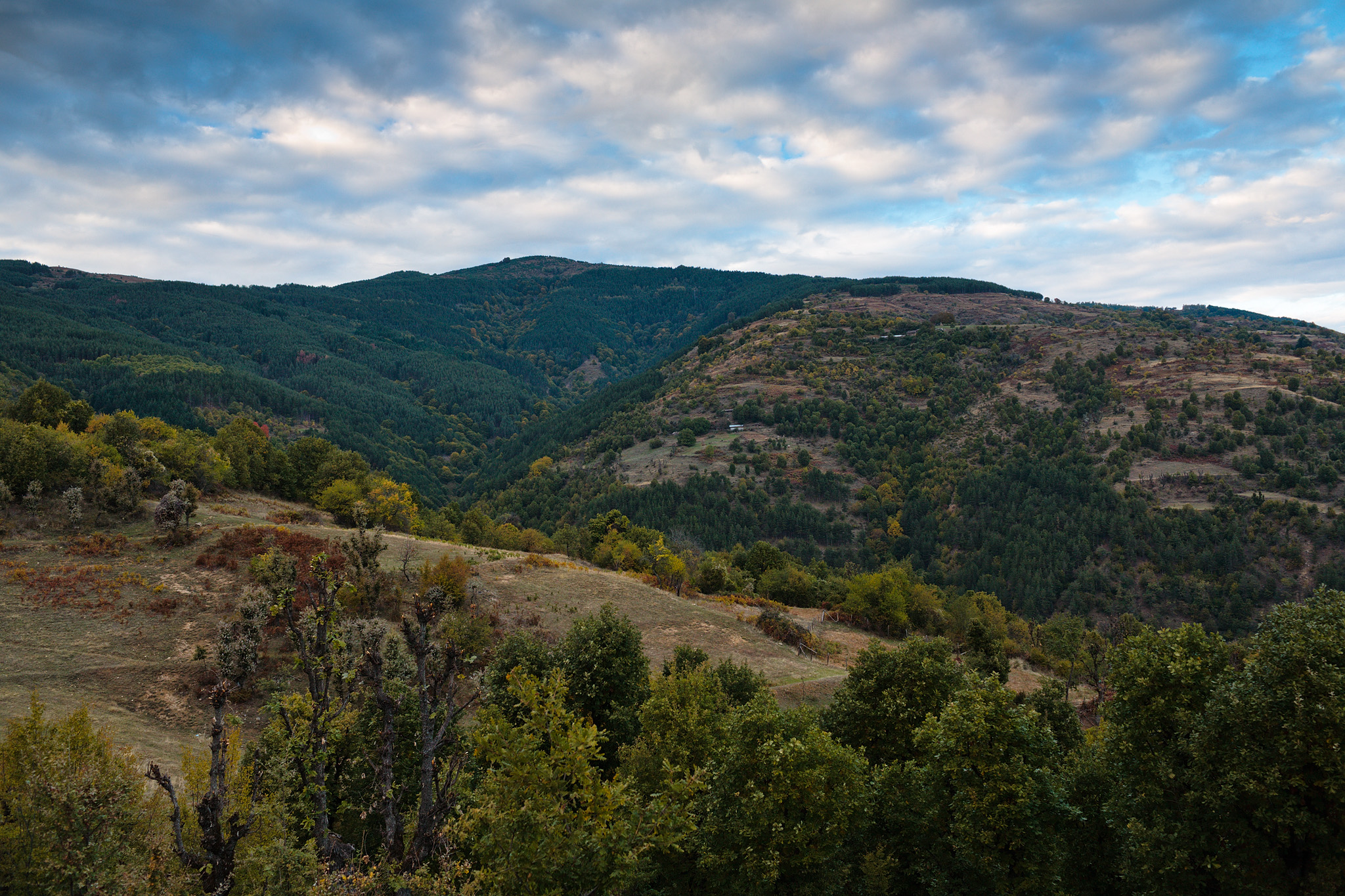
Markovi Kladentsi peak, Bulgaria
