= 11th Macedonian Infantry Division =

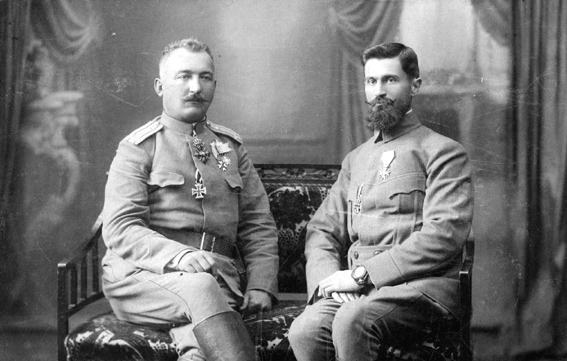
Todor Aleksandrov and Alexandar Protogerov as Bulgarian Army officers during the First World War.

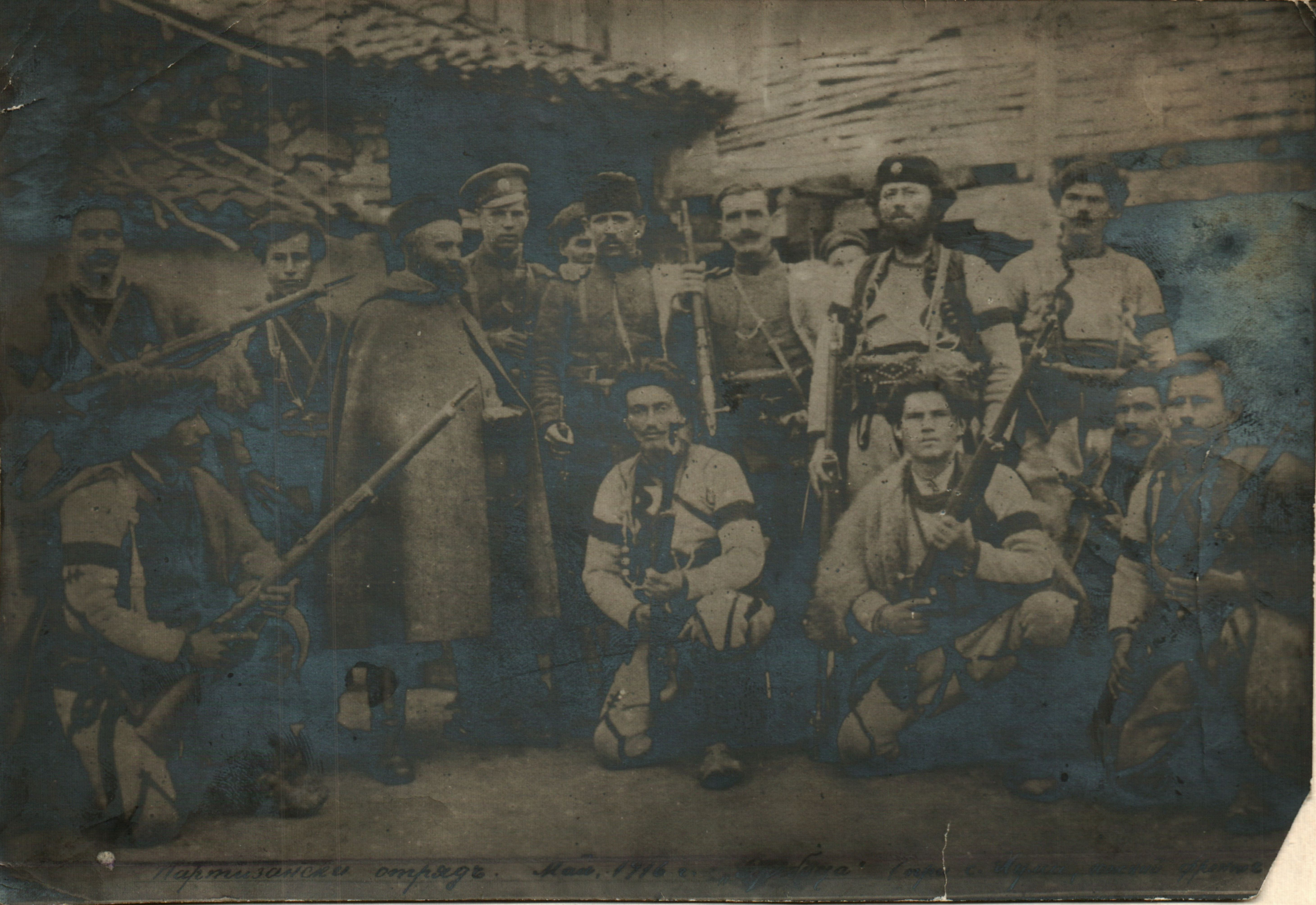
Guerilla company of the 11th Macedonian Infantry Division composed of IMRO paramilitaries.

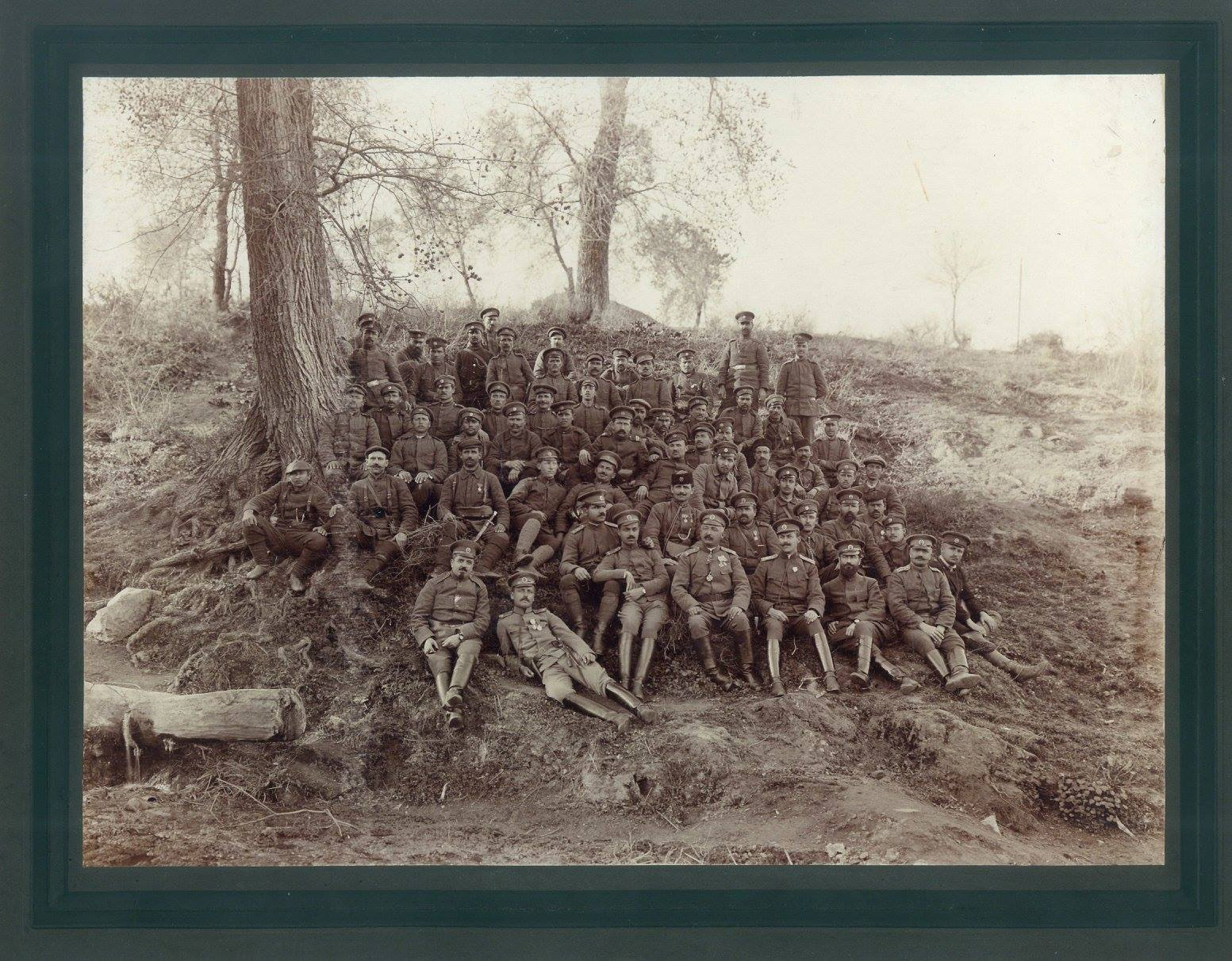
The officers in the headquarters of the 11th Division.

The 11th Macedonian Infantry Division was a Bulgarian military unit formed by Macedonian Bulgarians that operated in the First World War. The division is the successor of the Macedonian-Adrianopolitan Volunteer Corps.

== History ==
The division was established in 1915 on the idea of the leadership of the former Internal Macedonian Revolutionary Organization (IMRO) leadership around Colonel Aleksandar Protogerov. As early as January 1915, Major Petar Darvingov submitted to the Ministry of War a report on the use of the Macedonian-Adrianople Volunteer Corps, in which he argued that the re-formation of the militia could be necessary and justified mainly if it was given the task of occupying the region of Macedonia. The order to establish the 11th Division was issued on August 22, 1915. It was formed from September 1 to 4 by a special staff during the general mobilisation of the active Bulgarian army in September, just before Bulgaria's intervention in the First World War. It consisted from Bulgarians from Macedonia - refugee volunteers who did not serve in the Bulgarian army and deserters from the Serbian and Greek armies. The division includes 7 regiments - 6 infantry and 1 artillery, as well as other units with personnel as of its first operational day of 34,745 soldiers and officers.

Almost all the officers were from Macedonia. The commander of the division at the beginning was General Krastyu Zlatarev from Ohrid, and the chief of staff was Lieutenant Colonel Petar Darvingov from Kukush. Other officers were the commander of the Second Infantry Brigade - Colonel Grigor Kyurkchiev from Prilep, the commander of the Third Infantry Brigade Colonel Alexander Protogerov from Ohrid and the commander of the Fifth Macedonian Infantry Regiment - Lieutenant Colonel Boris Drangov from Skopje. A special guerilla detachment was established headed by Protogerov. It was envisaged to form 60 guerilla platoons and a separate guerilla company.

In 1915, during the Bulgarian offensive against Serbia, the division as part of the Second Bulgarian Army took part in the battles near Krivolak, Strumica, Kavadarci and Negotino. The personnel of the division were constantly replenished by soldiers who deserted from the Serbian army to the Bulgarian or to the allied to Bulgaria Austro-Hungarian troops. The following year, 1916, another artillery regiment was added to the 11th Division and it entered the fighting against British units in the Struma Valley. In May 1917 the division was reorganized on the model of the other Bulgarian divisions and its regiments received numbers from 59 to 64. In 1918 two brigades of the division were assigned to the Second Army, and one occupied part of the position in Belasitsa and participated in the Battle of Doiran (1918), in which the First Bulgarian Army repulsed the Anglo-Greek offensive. After the breakthrough at Dobro Pole in September 1918, the division retreated to Gorna Dzhumaya, where it was demobilised. In April 1919, the 11th Division was disbanded. The office of the Division in Sofia became the centre of the restoration of the IMRO and the unofficial headquarters of the organization. Part of the military equipment and weapons of the 11th Division is hidden by the Allied in secret warehouses and was inherited by IMRO.

== See also ==
- Bulgarian occupation of Serbia (World War I)
- Military history of Bulgaria during World War I
- First Army
- Second Army
- Third Army
- Fourth Army
