= Grljani =

Grljani Грљани
- Village
- Location within North Macedonia
- Coordinates: 41.938019°N 22.622103°E
- Country: North Macedonia
- Region: Eastern
- Municipality: Vinica

Population (2002)
  - Total: 206
- Time zone: UTC+1 (CET)
  - Summer (DST): UTC+2 (CEST)
- Website: .

Grljani (Macedonian: Грљани) is a village in the municipality of Vinica, North Macedonia.

== Demographics ==
According to the 2002 census, the village had a total of 206 inhabitants. Ethnic groups in the village include:

- Macedonians 206
