= Strumyani Municipality =

Coordinates: 41.6389°N 23.2029°E

Strumyani Municipality Община Струмяни
- Municipality
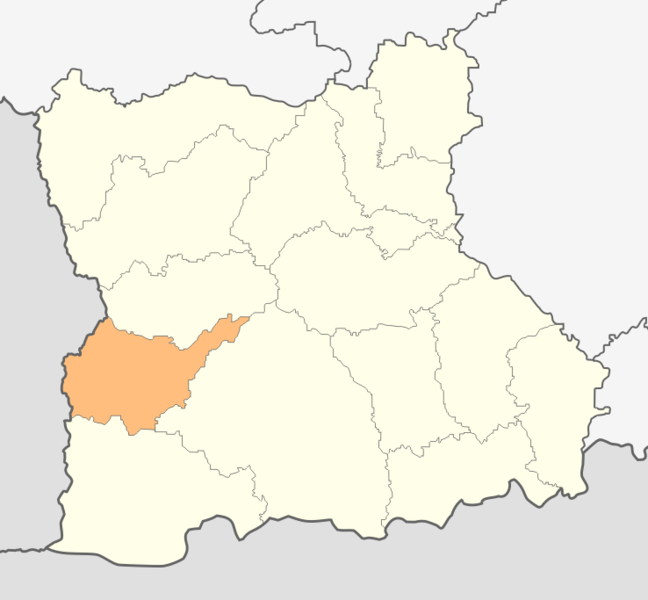
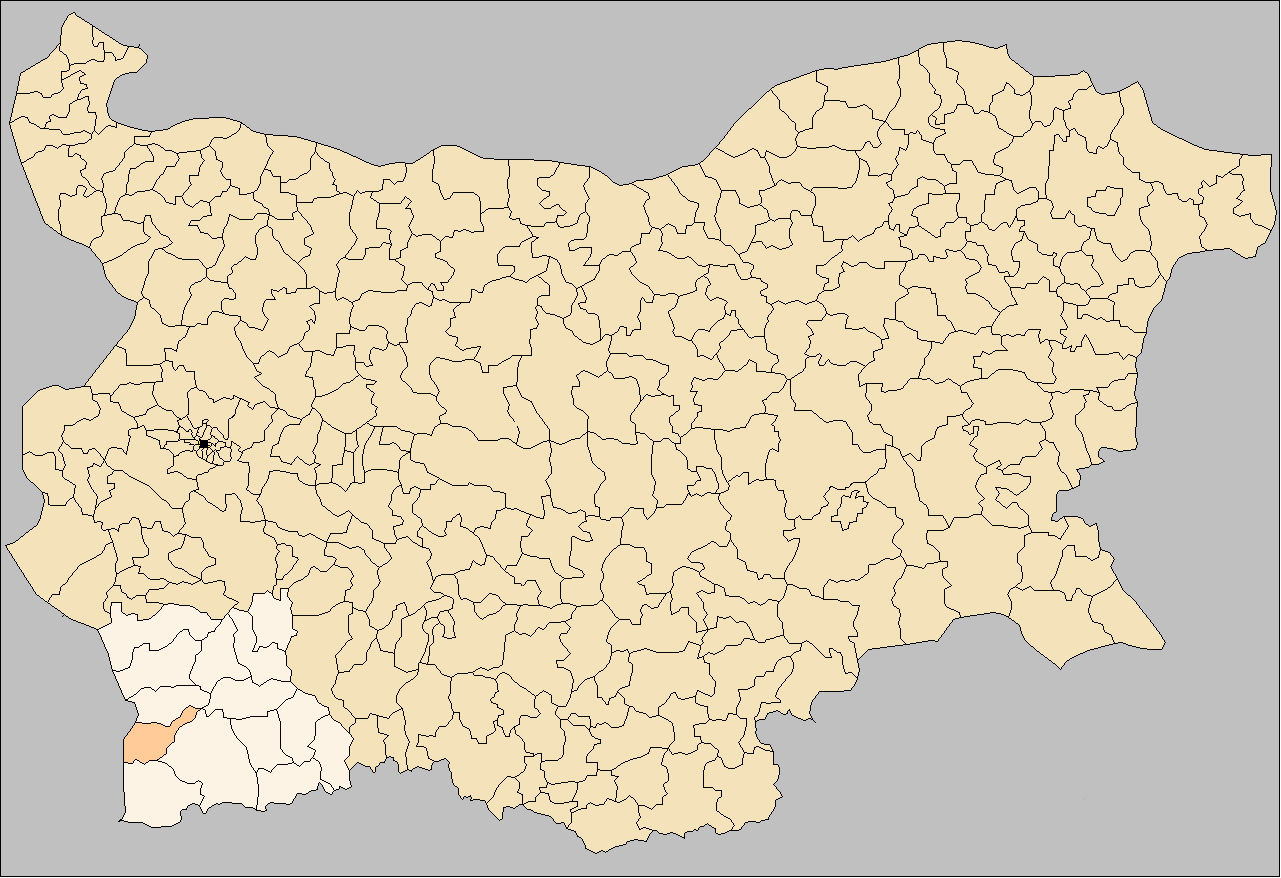
- Location in Blagoevgrad province Location on map of Bulgaria
- Country: Bulgaria
- Province (Oblast): Blagoevgrad

Area
  - Total: 355.19 km^{2} (137.14 sq mi)

Population
  - Total: 5,597
  - Density: 15.76/km^{2} (40.81/sq mi)

Strumyani Municipality is a municipality in Blagoevgrad Province in Southwestern Bulgaria.

== Demographics ==
=== Religion ===
According to the latest Bulgarian census of 2011, the religious composition, among those who answered the optional question on religious identification, was the following:

Religious composition of Strumyani Municipality
Orthodox Christianity	95.0%
Catholicism	0.2%
Protestantism	0.5%
Islam	0.1%
No religion	1.8%
Prefer not to answer, others and aindefinable	2.4%
