= Assyrians in Russia =

ܣܘܪ̈ܝܐ ܕܪܘܣܝܐ Ассирийцы в России
- (Assyrian homeland) (Russia)
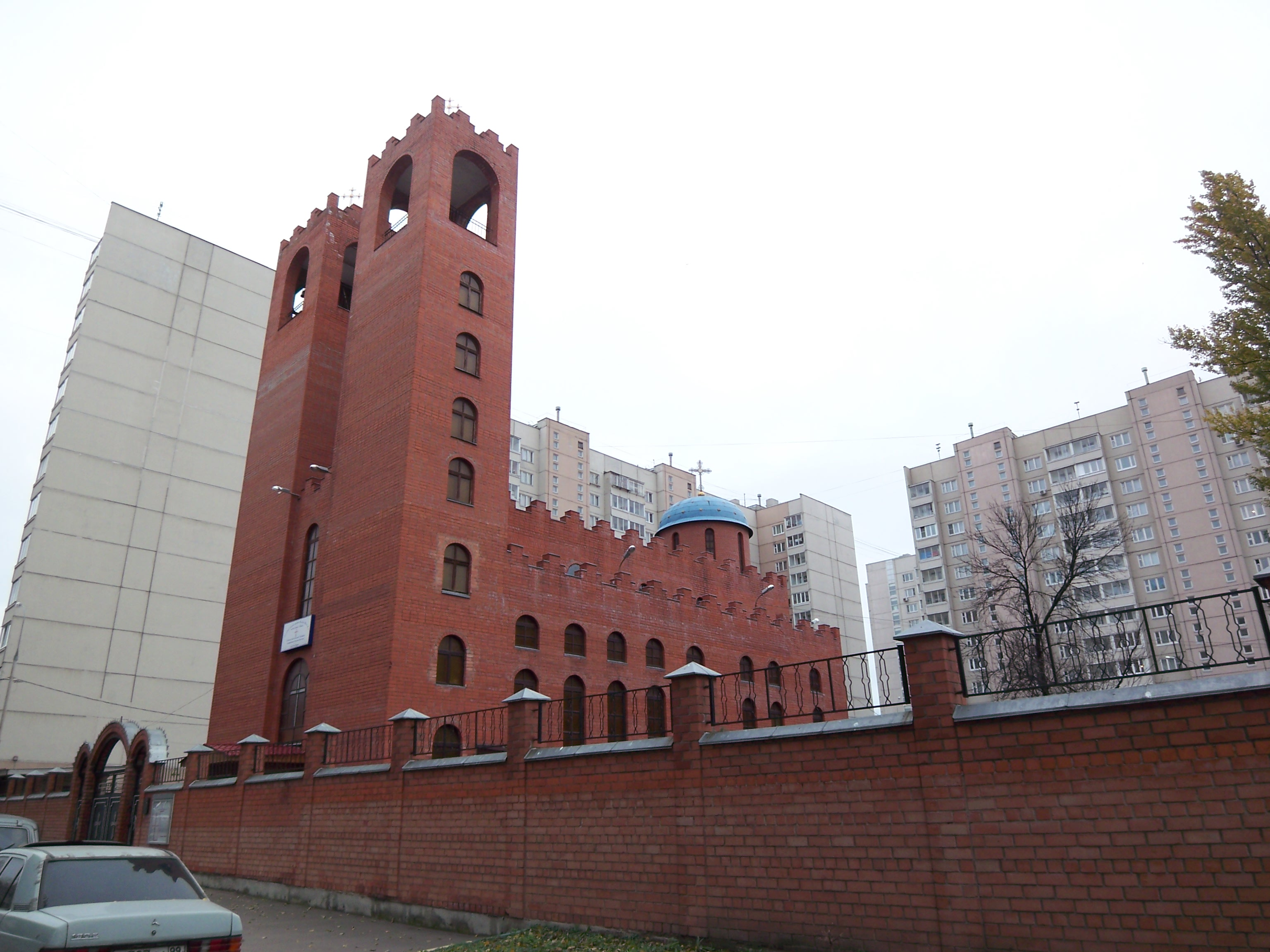
- St. Mary Assyrian Church in Moscow

Total population
- 14,000

Regions with significant populations
- St. Petersburg, Moscow, Rostov-on-Don, Krasnodar Krai, Kazan

Languages
- Assyrian Neo-Aramaic, Russian

Religion
- Assyrian Church of the East

Assyrians in Russia (Syriac: ܣܘܪ̈ܝܐ ܕܪܘܣܝܐ; Russian: Ассирийцы в России, romanized: Assiriytsy v Rossii), or Russian Assyrians, are Assyrian people or people of Assyrian descent living in the country of Russia. As of the 2002 Russian census, Assyrians number 14,000 people total in the country.

== History ==
Assyrians came to Russia and the Soviet Union in three main waves:

- The first wave was after the Treaty of Turkmenchay in 1828, which delineated a border between Russia and Persia. Many Assyrians suddenly found themselves under Russian sovereignty, and thousands of relatives crossed the border to join them.
- The second wave was a result of the repression and violence during and after World War I. Assyrians were represented by the All-Russian Union of Assyrians "Khoyad-Atur" from 1924 to 1928.
- The third wave came after World War II when Moscow unsuccessfully tried establishing a satellite state in Iranian Kurdistan. Soviet troops withdrew in 1946 and left the Assyrians exposed to the same kind of retaliation that they had suffered from the Turks 30 years earlier. Again, many Assyrians found refuge in the Soviet Union, this time mainly in the cities. From 1937 to 1959, the Assyrian population in the USSR grew by 587.3%. The Soviets in the thirties oppressed the Assyrians' religion and persecuted religious and other leaders.

=== Soviet Union ===
During World War II, a number of Assyrians were registered as soldiers or in high-ranking positions in the Soviet Armed Forces; more than 6,000 total were mobilized for fighting. Lado Davydov and Sergey Sarkhoshev were the only two Assyrian soldiers in the USSR to be given the honor of Hero of the Soviet Union. Major general Alexander Tamrazov led troops into battle in the Kuban region, and his brother (who was also a general) would also be honored for activities in the Krasnodar region. Another high-ranking officer, Georgi Ilyich Sarkisov, served in the Ukrainian Soviet Army for many decades.

== Current situation ==
According to the 2002 Russian census, there were 14,000 Assyrians in Russia. 13,300 people (95% of all Assyrians) spoke Assyrian Neo-Aramaic as their native language.

In 1998, the Mat Maryam temple was built in Moscow.

Urmia, Krasnodar Krai is a predominantly Assyrian village in Russia.

== See also ==
- ru:Православные ассирийцы (Assyrians of Orthodox faith)
