= Vlaycho Zhechev =

Bulgarian mystic

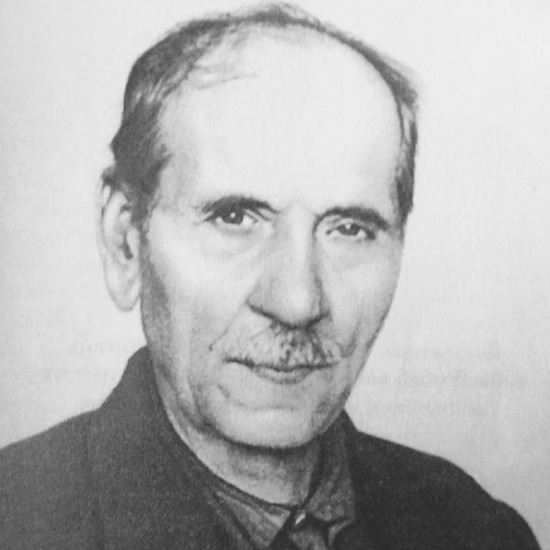
- Born: August 15, 1894; Konovo, Bulgaria
- Died: May 8, 1981 (aged 86); Nova Zagora, Bulgaria

Vlaicho Zhechev, known as Dyado Vlaycho (Bulgarian: Влайчо Жечев/Дядо Влайчо), was a Bulgarian mystic and folk healer who survived the early concentration camps in Bulgaria during the communist regime. Known for his altruistic help to others, he is also referred to as the "Silverless" and the "Prophet of the People".

== Biography ==
=== Early life ===
Dyado Vlaycho was born into a wealthy agricultural family in the Nova Zagora village of Konyovo on August 15, 1894. His mother died when he was six, fostering in him a deep devotion to God. At the age of ten, he had a precognition of the Balkan Wars, which began eight years later. When his father and most of the men in the village were mobilized for World War I, he began making predictions on who would return alive. He enlisted as a volunteer in 1916, but refused to carry a rifle and was sent to cook.

After returning from the front, Dyado Vlaycho became a follower of Bulgarian spiritual teacher Petеr Dеunov. He later founded his own society for psychic research and began his occult interpretations, wrote poems and revelations. He practiced Paneurhythmy at sunrise, worked in the fields during the day, and in the evenings, he led his group of spiritual followers. He was engaged to a girl from a wealthy family, but chose to live a celibate life inspired by the ancient Jewish prophets.

The news of Dyado Vlaycho's healing abilities spread widely, drawing people from across Bulgaria. His relatives erected shacks for the awaited sick and disabled. In 1938, Tsar Boris III summoned Dyado Vlaycho to the Vrana palace. Vlaycho predicted the birth of an heir but also foretold, '...a king will be born without reigning,' after which the tsar never sought him out again.

=== Prison period ===
After the communists took power in Bulgaria in 1944, Dyado Vlaycho, who was considered close to the old regime and religious, was investigated, arrested, and convicted for anti-national conspiracy. His alleged offense was predicting Georgi Dimitrov's death two years prior to 1949. He was first sent to a forced labor camp in Pernik, then moved to Belene, where he endured the humiliation of being publicly doused with ice water while naked. Reportedly Dyado Vlaycho responded to the executioner, 'Don't bother with me, hurry to your home.' Allegedly, the official experienced a personal tragedy—the death of his child. In 1951, he was transferred to Bobov Dol and worked in the mines. Reportedly, he alerted the chief about an imminent collapse, resulting in a non-working day that saved lives when a landslide buried the mine galleries. This prediction is believed to have contributed to his release in 1953.

=== Wandering period ===
During the final 15 years of his life, Dyado Vlaycho traveled extensively at night throughout Bulgaria as a wandering healer and prophet. He was reputed to possess remedies for every ailment, with his touch considered especially potent in relieving pain. Throughout his travels, he regularly visited Konyovo to collect letters mostly from across Bulgaria, but also some from Turkey, Greece, Serbia, Romania, Russia, and Australia. At times, people placed money in the letters he received, which he either returned or passed on to someone in need. He always answered all written requests for help, depositing his replies in various mailboxes due to the discovery of some of his hiding places by communist authorities. Dyado Vlaycho died at the age of 86 in 1981. In 2019, his native village erected a memorial complex known as the 'House of Goodness' in his honor, where items touched by his hands are regarded as sacred.

== Visions ==
Throughout his life, Dyado Vlaycho lived as an ascetic, believing that difficulties were the engine of life: 'The higher a soul is, the more trials it has to go through,' he stated. He attributed his mystical abilities to God's providence and his faith in repentance and redemption. "It is freely given to me by God, freely I give it," was his response to why he never accepted payment from those who sought his help. Ignored for decades in Bulgaria, Dyado Vlaycho is now acknowledged as a rare mystic believed to have foreseen his own future, anticipating his survival from communist death camps. Some of his predictions, documented after his death, referenced environmental pollution and the increase in areas with contaminated crops. He therefore advised people to consume more fruits and vegetables grown in elevated areas to avoid absorbing earthly toxins.

== See also ==
- Peter Deunov
- Slava Sevryukova
- Baba Vanga
