= Urmia (disambiguation) =

Urmia is a city in and the capital of West Azerbaijan Province, Iran.

Urmia may also refer to:

- Lake Urmia, a salt lake in northwestern Iran
- Urmia County, a county in West Azerbaijan Province in Iran
- Urmia University, a major university in the city of Urmia
- Urmia Airport, an airport in Urmia
- Urmia, Krasnodar Krai, Assyrian village in Russia
- University Risk Management and Insurance Association (URMIA), a higher education risk management organization in the United States.
- Urmia Institute, a world federalist organization in the United States

== See also ==
- Oromia, a regional state of Ethiopia
