= Rupite =

Rupite Рупите
- Village
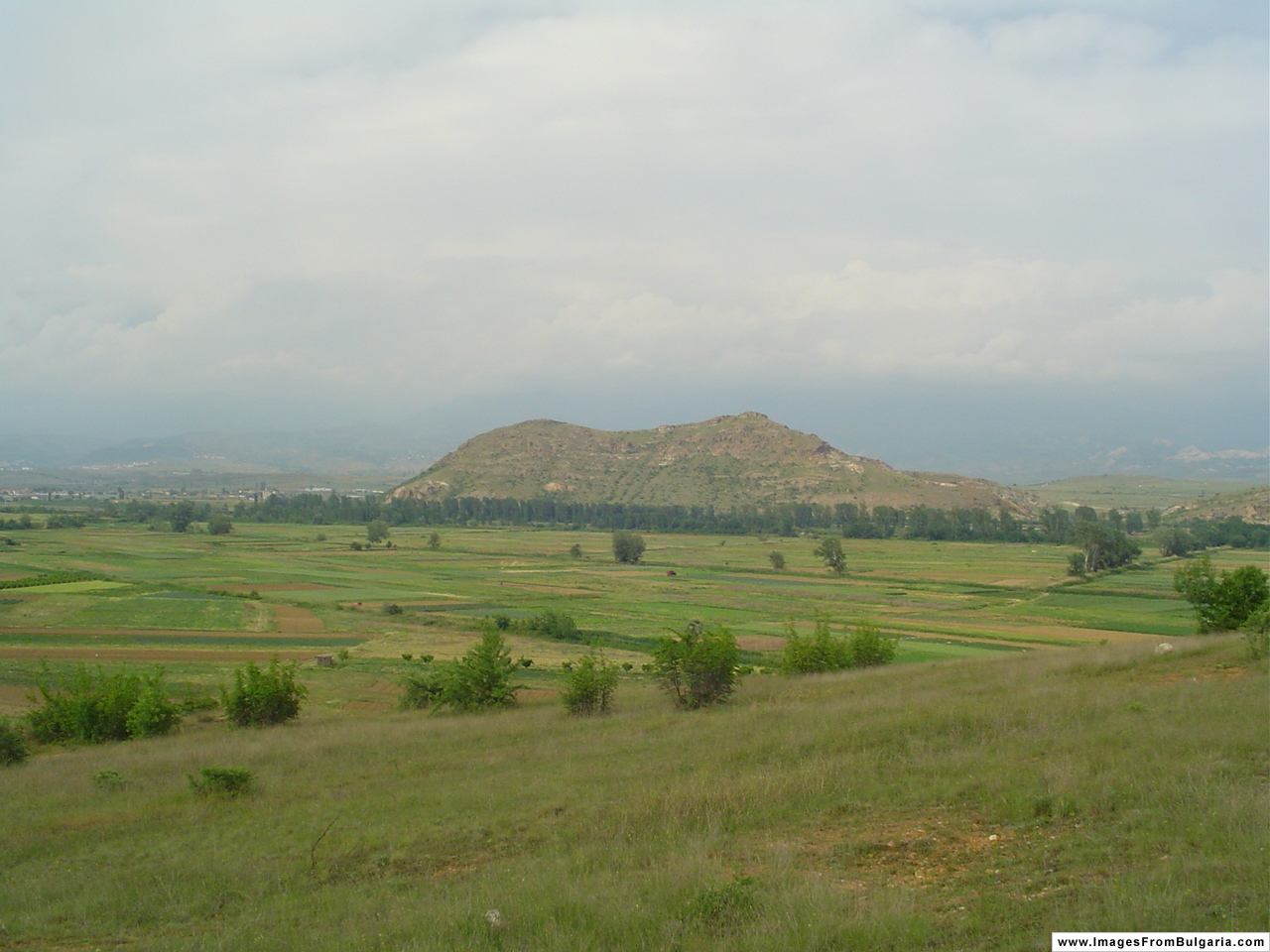

- Location within Bulgaria
- Coordinates: 41°26′30″N 23°14′28″E
- Country: Bulgaria
- Province: Blagoevgrad
- Municipality: Petrich

Government
  - Mayor: Georgi Atanasov

Area
  - Total: 9,257 km^{2} (3,574 sq mi)
- Elevation: 147 m (482 ft)

Population (2019)
  - Total: 926 ▼
  - Density: 0.100/km^{2} (0.259/sq mi)
- Postal code: 2863

Rupite (Bulgarian: Рупите, pronounced [ˈrupitɛ]) is a village which includes a small mountainous protected area in the southeastern part of Blagoevgrad Province, Bulgaria, 11 kilometers northeast of Petrich, Petrich Municipality, on the western bank of the Struma River. It is best known as the place where alleged Bulgarian clairvoyant Baba Vanga lived. The area is also associated with the crater of an extinct volcano, the hills of Kozhuh and Pchelina, and the warm thermal springs. The village has 1,124 inhabitants.

== Nature ==
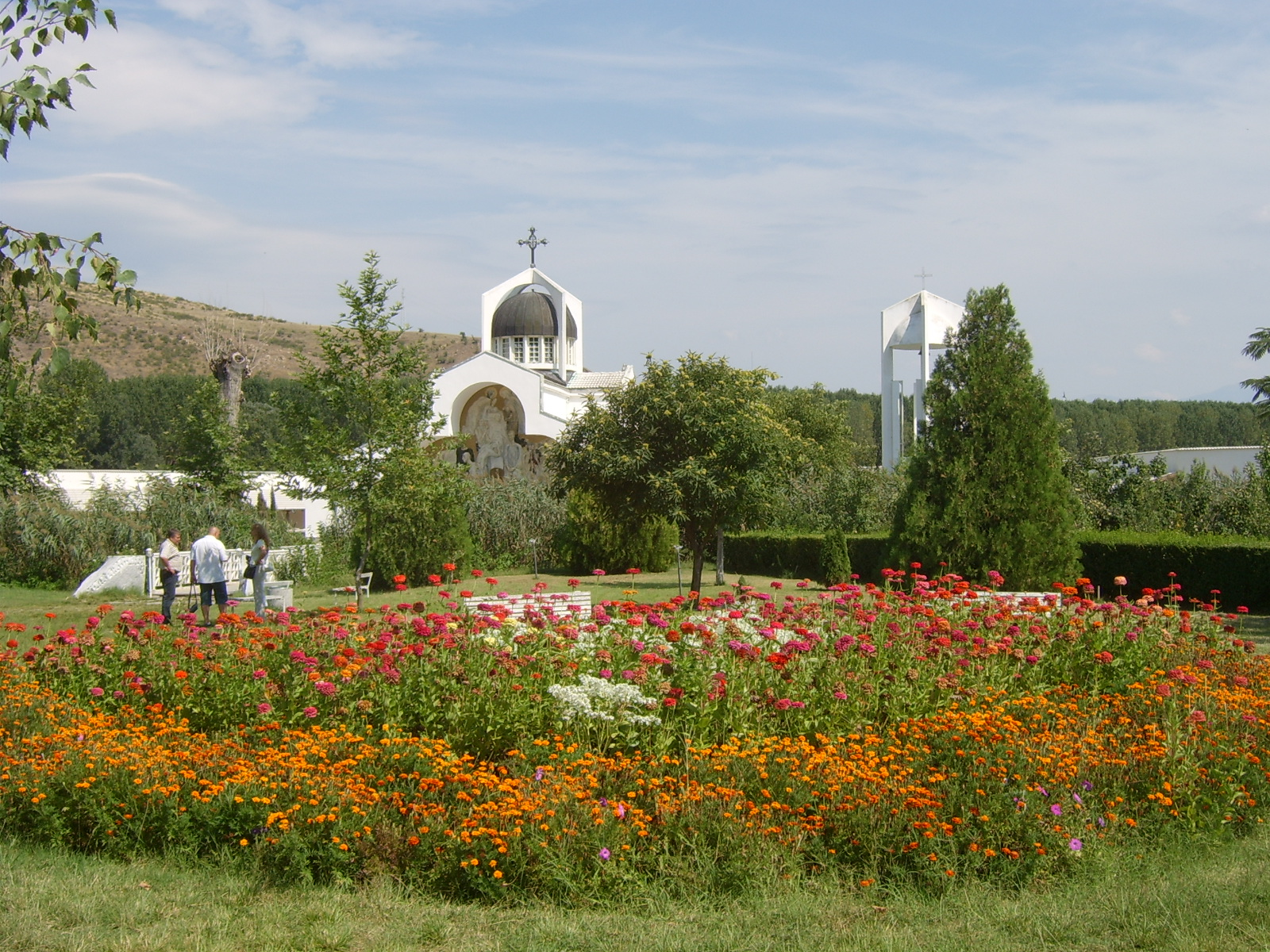
Gardens near the St. Petka temple

The landscape of Rupite is dominated by the eminence of Kozhuh (кожух, "fur coat," taking its name from its shape) to the west. Although it is only 281 m high, it rises prominently from the flat Petrich Plain. The eminence, which is part of the outskirts of an extinct volcano, consists of three small summits, of which the middle one is the highest. Volcanic rocks and rock pyramids can be observed at the foot of Kozhuh.

The climate in the locality is transitional between continental and Mediterranean, featuring hot, dry summers and relatively mild winters. The natural vegetation consists mainly of white poplar (Populus alba), and there are 13 plant species endangered in Bulgaria. Almost all of the snake species observed in the country can be found in Rupite, including the European cat snake (Telescopus fallax), as well as four species of tortoises. A total of 201 bird species inhabit the area. Via Aristotelis, which passes nearby, is one of the two main bird migration routes through Bulgaria. Some bird species include the olive-tree warbler (Hippolais olivetorum), masked shrike (Lanius nubicus), and lesser grey shrike (Lanius minor). The pygmy cormorant (Phalacrocorax pygmaeus) winters in the area.

Because of its volcanic origin and the abundance of rare species of both flora and fauna, Kozhuh is a proclaimed natural landmark since 1962. A 0.4-hectare protected area is located about 2 km from the village of Rupite at the eastern foot of Kozhuh.

Rupite is also famous for its healing mineral springs with a temperature of 71-78 °C and an average discharge of 35 L/s.

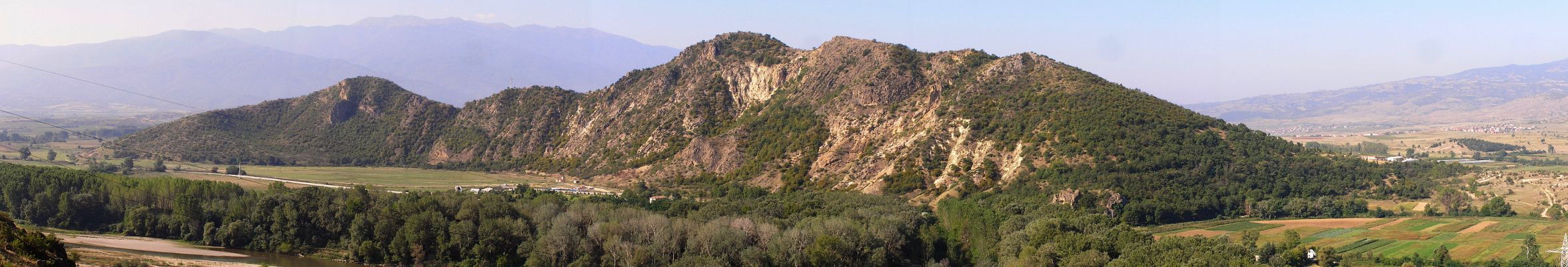
Despite being relatively low, Kozhuh stands out in the surrounding plains.

== History ==
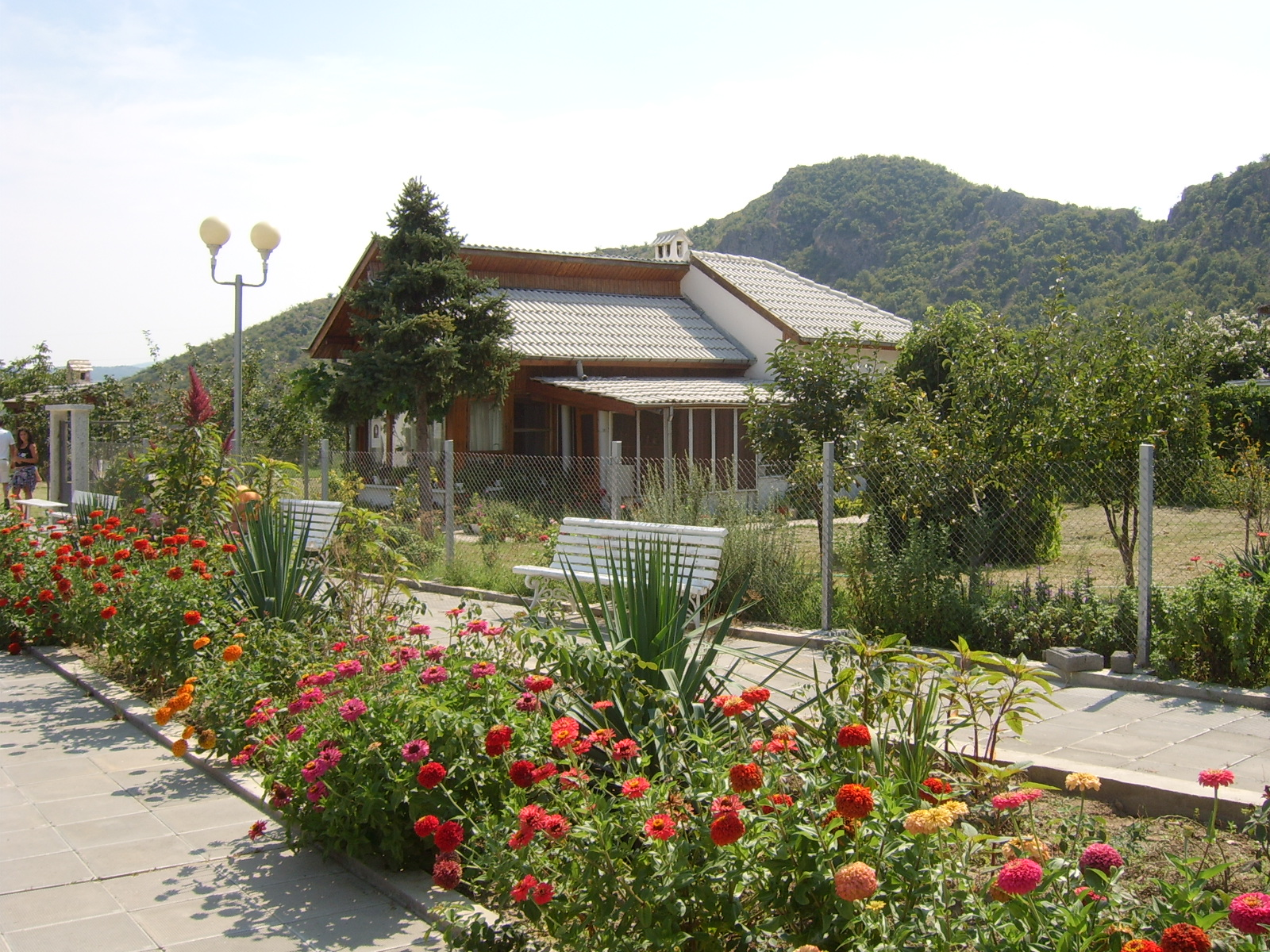
Baba Vanga's house.

Remains of an ancient town were discovered at the southwestern foot of Kozhuh. In 2002, a Latin inscription dated 308 CE and consisting of an imperial appeal addressed to the local urban citizens, suggests that the settlement was Heraclea Sintica. The town likely existed from 4th century BCE to the 6th century CE, and was the main town of the Thracian tribe Sints.

Today Rupite is mostly famous as the residence of the late alleged clairvoyant Baba Vanga (Vangeliya Gushterova, 1911 – 1996), who still attracts thousands of worshipers and tourists. According to a legend, Vanga lost her sight during a storm in her early childhood, but during the accident she had a vision, which gave her clairvoyance abilities. In the last years of her life, Vanga lived in a small house in Rupite, because according to her relatives she considered the area an "energy source" from which she collected her powers.According to the statistics of Vasil Kanchov in 1900, Shirbanovo (as it was known before) was populated by 252 Bulgarian Christians.

== Population ==
The village of Rupite had 926 inhabitants at the end of 2019, up from 626 inhabitants in 1934 but down from 1,248 people in 1985. The population is declining since Fall of Communism. Nearly all inhabitants are ethnic Bulgarians (99.6%).

== Church ==
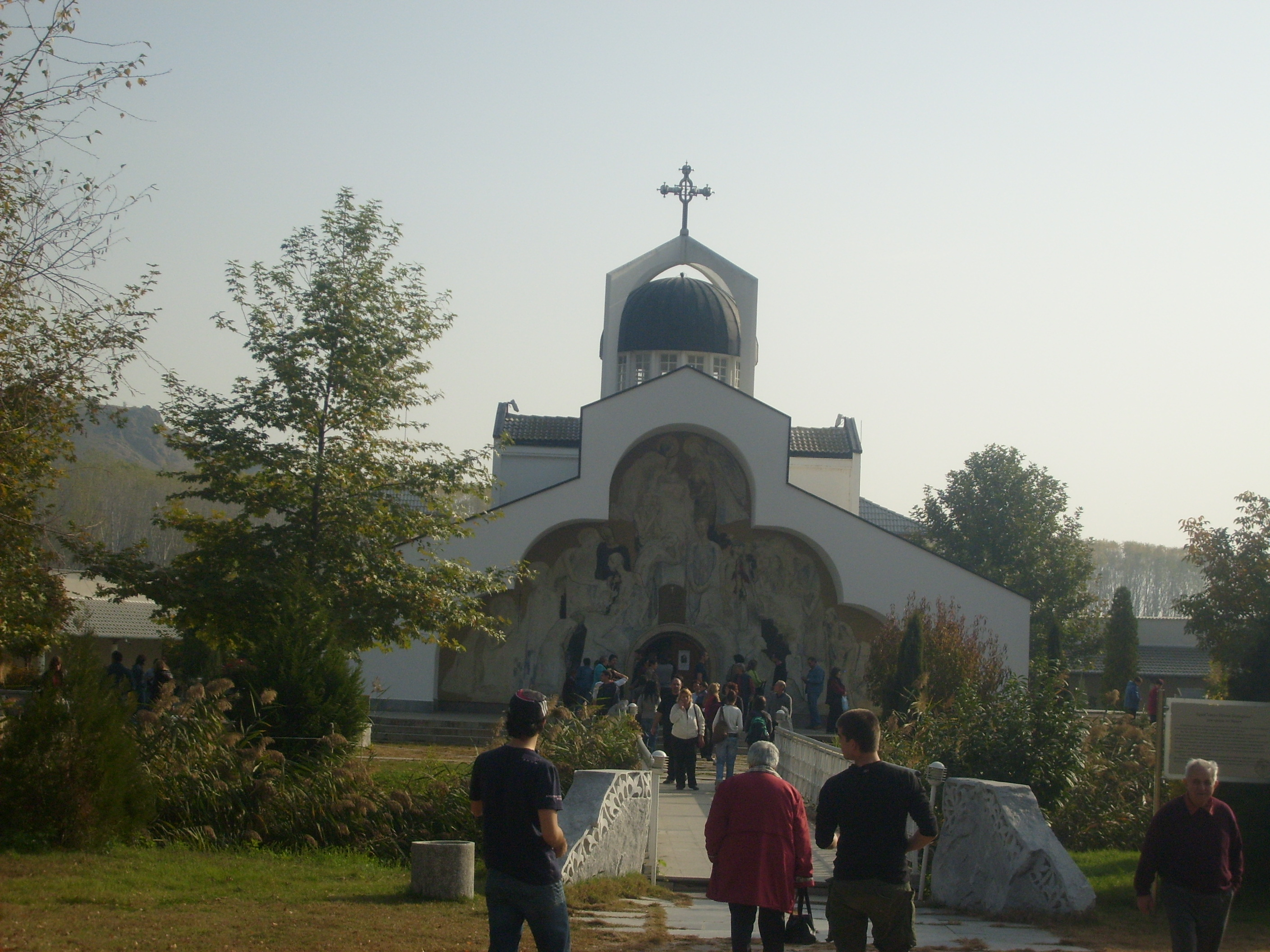
St Petka of Bulgaria, Baba Vanga's church.

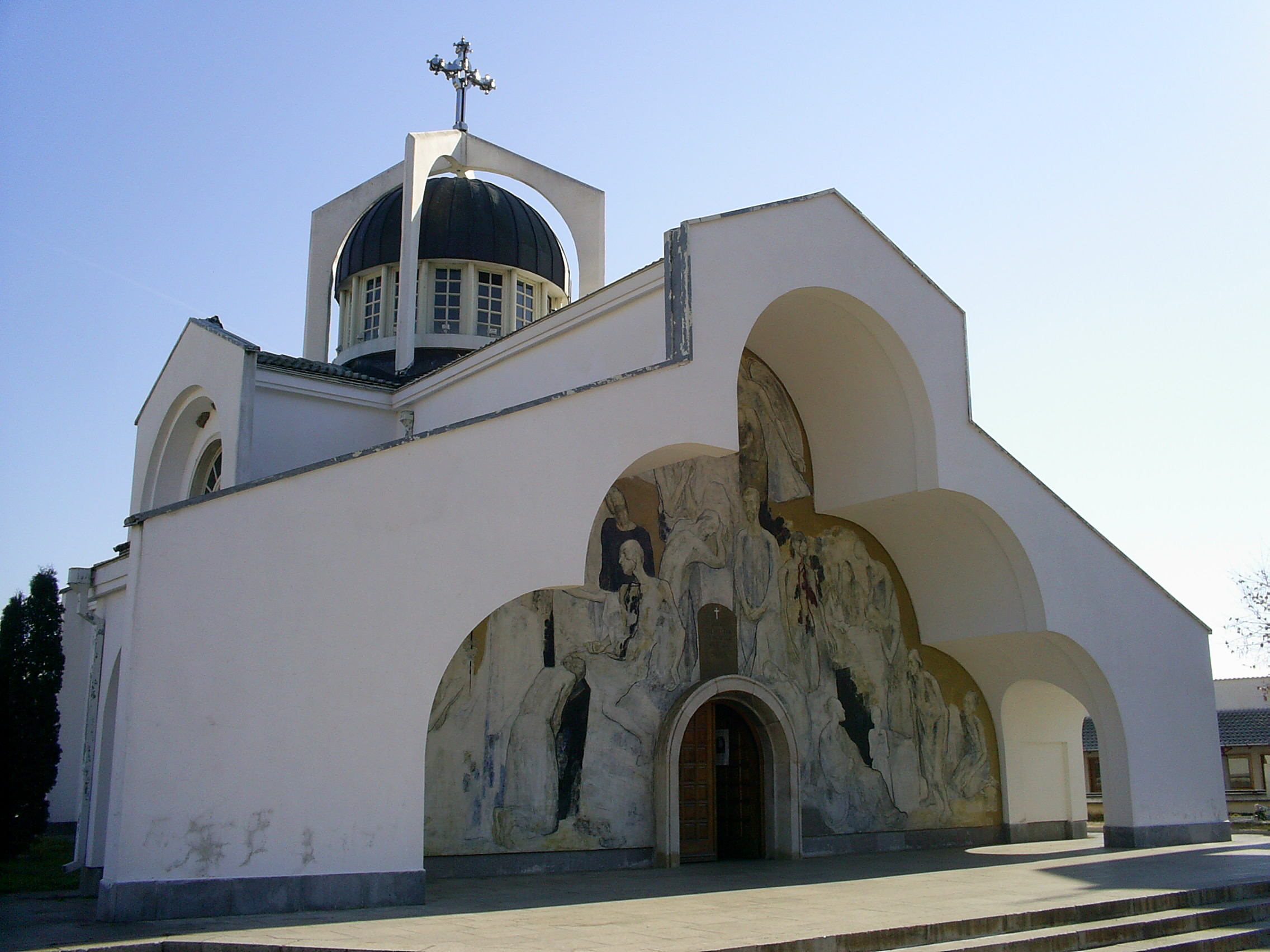
St Petka of Bulgaria, Baba Vanga's church.

The memorial temple "St. Petka of Bulgaria" was sponsored by Baba Vanga and built in 1994 at a site chosen by her in 1992. It has since become a place of worship for many people and a renowned tourist attraction. The icons were created by artist Svetlin Rusev and were not generally approved by the Holy Synod of the Bulgarian Orthodox Church for being too realistic and not conforming to the canons. The house of Vanga can be seen nearby, and a new monastery is currently under construction.

== Honour ==
Rupite Glacier on Smith Island, South Shetland Islands is named after Rupite.

== See also ==
- Heraclea Sintica
