= Baba Vanga =

Bulgarian mystic (1911–1996)

- Баба Ванга
- Born: Vangeliya Pandeva Surcheva; 3 October 1911; Strumica, Ottoman Empire
- Died: 11 August 1996 (aged 84); Sofia, Bulgaria
- Citizenship: Ottoman, Bulgarian, Yugoslav
- Occupations: Clairvoyant (attributed); Healer (attributed)
- Spouse: Dimitar Gushterov (m. 1942; died 1962)

Vangeliya Pandeva Gushterova (née Surcheva; Bulgarian: Вангелия Пандева Гущерова, née Сурчева, [vɐnˈɡɛlijɐ ˈpɑndevɐ ɡuˈʃtɛrovɐ (ˈsurt͡ʃevɐ)]; 3 October 1911 – 11 August 1996), commonly known as Baba Vanga (Bulgarian: Баба Ванга, lit. 'Grandmother Vanga'), was a Bulgarian attributed mystic and healer who claimed to have foreseen the future. Blind since her teenhood, she spent most of her life in the Rupite area of the Belasica mountains in Bulgaria.

During the Cold War, she became widely known in parts of Eastern Europe for her alleged abilities of clairvoyance and precognition. After the fall of communism, including after her death in 1996, her persona has remained popular.

== Early life ==
=== Premature birth and naming ===
On 3 October 1911, Vanga was born to Pando Surchev and Paraskeva Surcheva in Strumica in the Salonica vilayet of the Ottoman Empire (now North Macedonia). She was a premature baby who suffered from health complications. In accordance with local tradition, the baby was not given a name until she was deemed likely to survive. When the baby first cried out, a midwife went into the street and asked a stranger for a name. The stranger proposed Andromaha (Andromache). According to Krasimira Stoyanova, Vanga's niece and biographer, many women in Strumica then had Greek names, but the midwife rejected the proposed name because she did not like it. Another stranger's proposal was also a Greek name, which was accepted due to its popularity and adapted to the Bulgarian version: Vangeliya.

In the two years following Vanga's birth, during 1912 and 1913, two Balkan Wars were fought, concluding with the Treaty of Bucharest in 1913, according to which Strumica was ceded to Bulgaria.

=== Childhood ===
During her childhood, Vanga's father was an Internal Macedonian Revolutionary Organization activist in the pro-Bulgarian branch, who seemed to have a strong sense of local Macedonian identity. Her mother died when giving birth, when Vanga was three years old, while her father was conscripted into the Bulgarian Army during World War I. This left Vanga dependent on the care and charity of her neighbor.

After the war, Strumica was ceded to the Kingdom of Serbs, Croats and Slovenes (i.e., Kingdom of Yugoslavia). Royal Yugoslav authorities arrested Vanga's father because of his pro-Bulgarian activity. They confiscated all of his property and the family fell into poverty for many years. Her father, being a widower, eventually remarried, thus providing a stepmother to his daughter.

=== Blindness ===
In 1923, Vanga and her father moved to Novo Selo. At the age of 13, a whirlwind allegedly lifted her into the air and threw her into a nearby field. According to Stoyanova, she was found after a long search, covered with dirt, stones and branches. Stoyanova described her as very frightened, and her eyes were covered with sand and dust; she was unable to open them because of the pain. She had two unsuccessful operations in Skopje, while the third operation was only partial, because her father lacked money. This resulted in a gradual loss of sight. In 1925, Vanga was taken to a school for the blind in the city of Zemun, in the Kingdom of Serbs, Croats and Slovenes (now Serbia), where she spent three years and was taught to read Braille, play the piano, knit, cook, and clean. After the death of her stepmother, she returned home to take care of her younger siblings. The family lived in poverty. In 1939, Vanga contracted pleurisy and was ill for eight months. The doctor's opinion was that she would die soon, but she recovered.

== Attracting believers during World War II ==
During World War II, Yugoslavia was invaded and carved up by the Axis powers and Strumica was annexed by Bulgaria. At that time Vanga attracted believers in her alleged ability to heal and soothsay—a number of people visited her, hoping to get a hint about whether their relatives were alive, or seeking the place where they died. Bulgarian tzar Boris III had reportedly visited her too.

== Marriage and widowhood ==
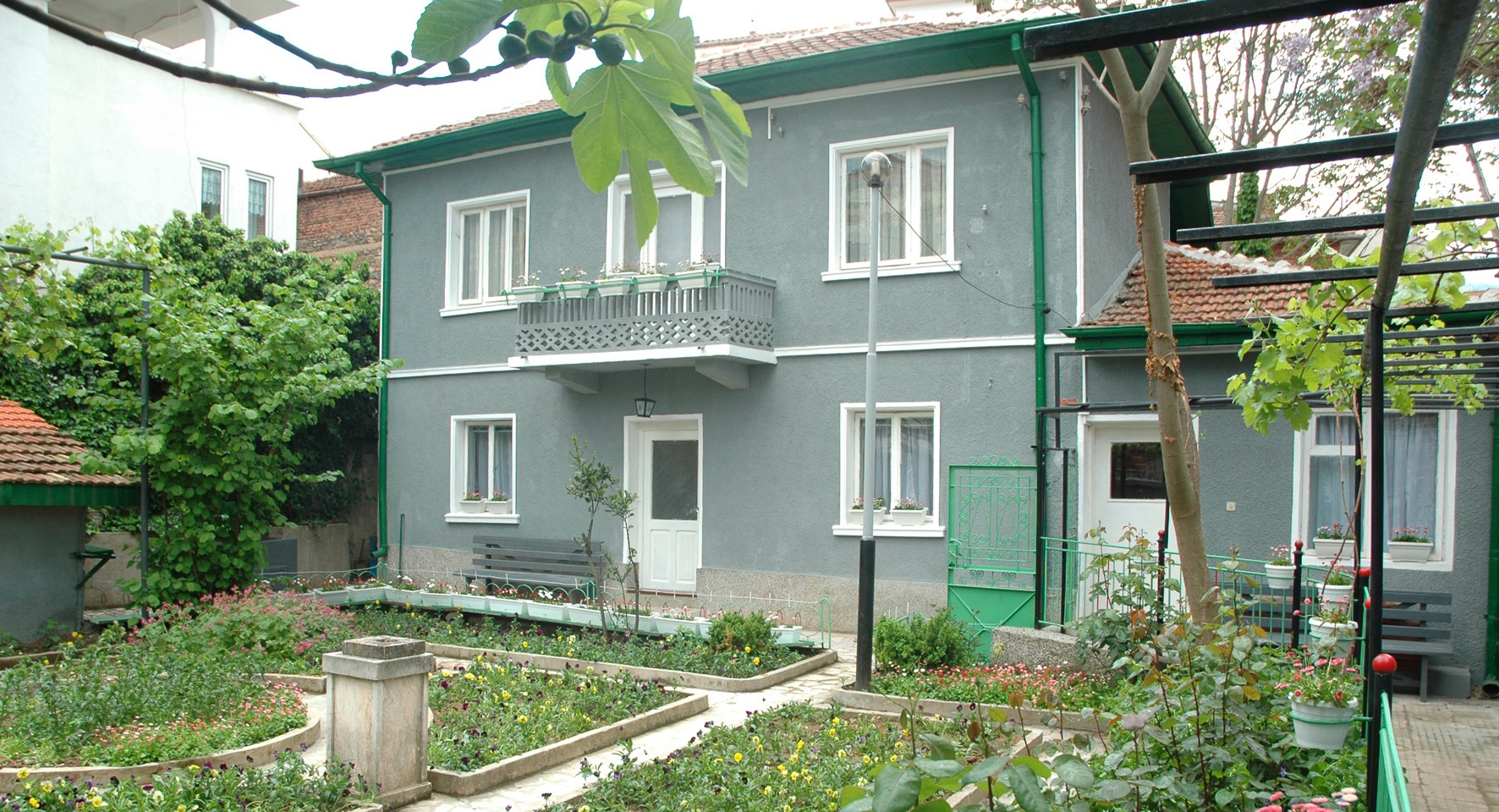
Vanga's house in Petrich.

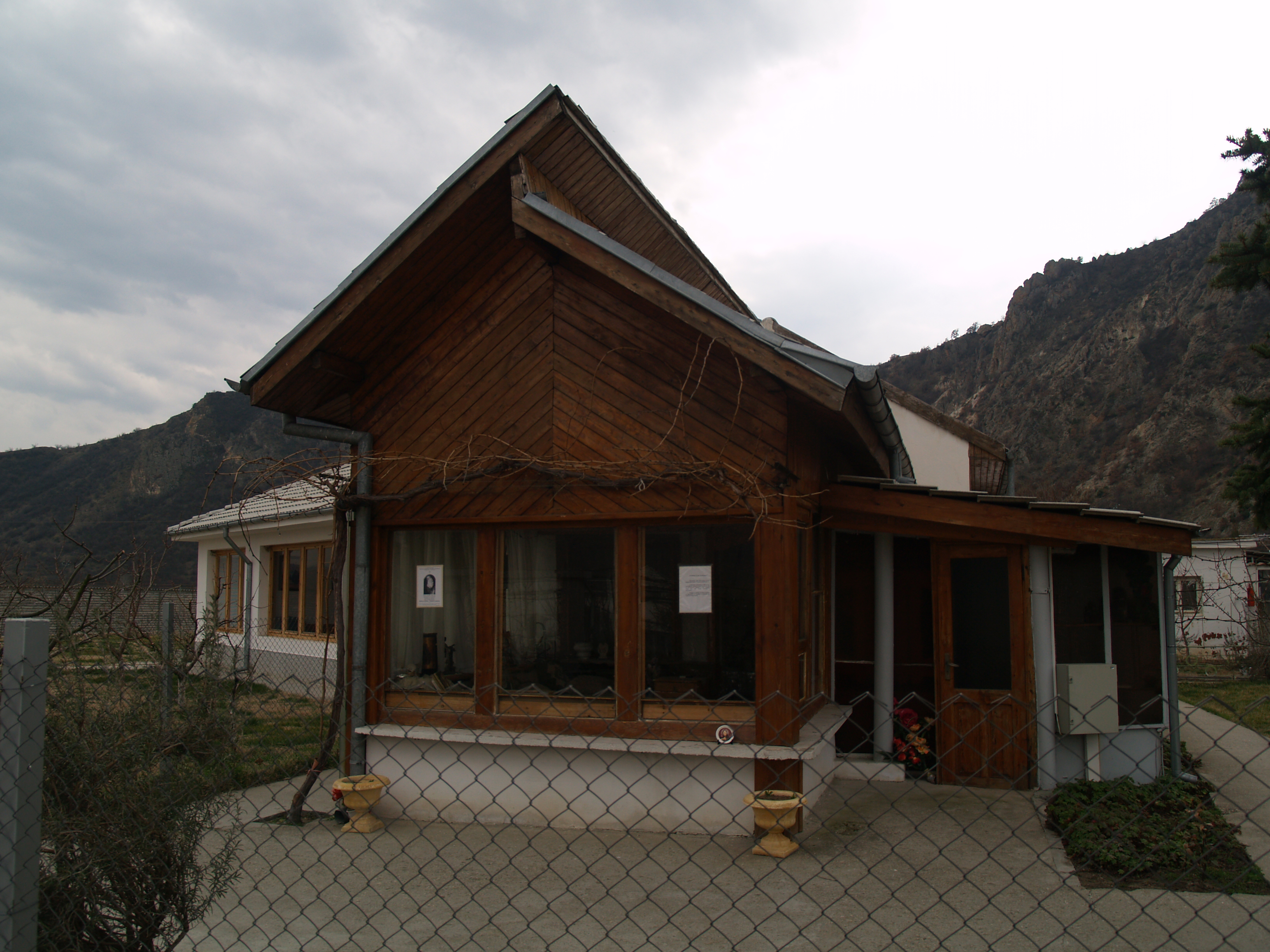
Vanga's last house (built in 1970) in Rupite, Petrich.

On 10 May 1942, Vanga married Dimitar Gushterov. Gushterov, a Bulgarian soldier from the village of Krandzhilitsa near Petrich, had come to town seeking revenge for his brother's killing. Shortly before marriage, Dimitar and Vanga moved to Petrich, where she soon became well known. Dimitar was then conscripted in the Bulgarian Army and was stationed in Northern Greece, which was annexed by Bulgaria at the time. Gushterov became ill, fell into alcoholism, and eventually died on 1 April 1962.

== Employment by the Institute of Suggestology ==
After World War II, the Bulgarian police and communist party tried to suppress Vanga's activities, but she continued to be visited by people. In the 1960s, psychologist Georgi Lozanov became interested in studying her. In that period, the main task of the newly established Institute of Suggestology was to study her alleged abilities. After police control and social pressure diminished in the 1960s, she was employed by the Petrich municipality and Institute of Suggestology (part of the Bulgarian Academy of Sciences). The former supported Vanga materially and took part of her income, while the latter tried to scientifically justify her activities. Due to the institute's efforts, apart from Bulgaria and Yugoslavia, she became popular in parts of the Eastern Bloc. Many people came to visit her, and the local municipality eventually imposed an admission fee for visits. Apparently Bulgarians were charged 10 leva, while foreigners were charged 30 leva for visits. Vanga was discussed in the 1970 book Psychic Discoveries Behind the Iron Curtain. Members of the Politburo of the Bulgarian Communist Party and leading intellectuals also consulted her, including, reportedly, General Secretary of the Communist Party of the Soviet Union Leonid Brezhnev.

== Building her own church and death ==
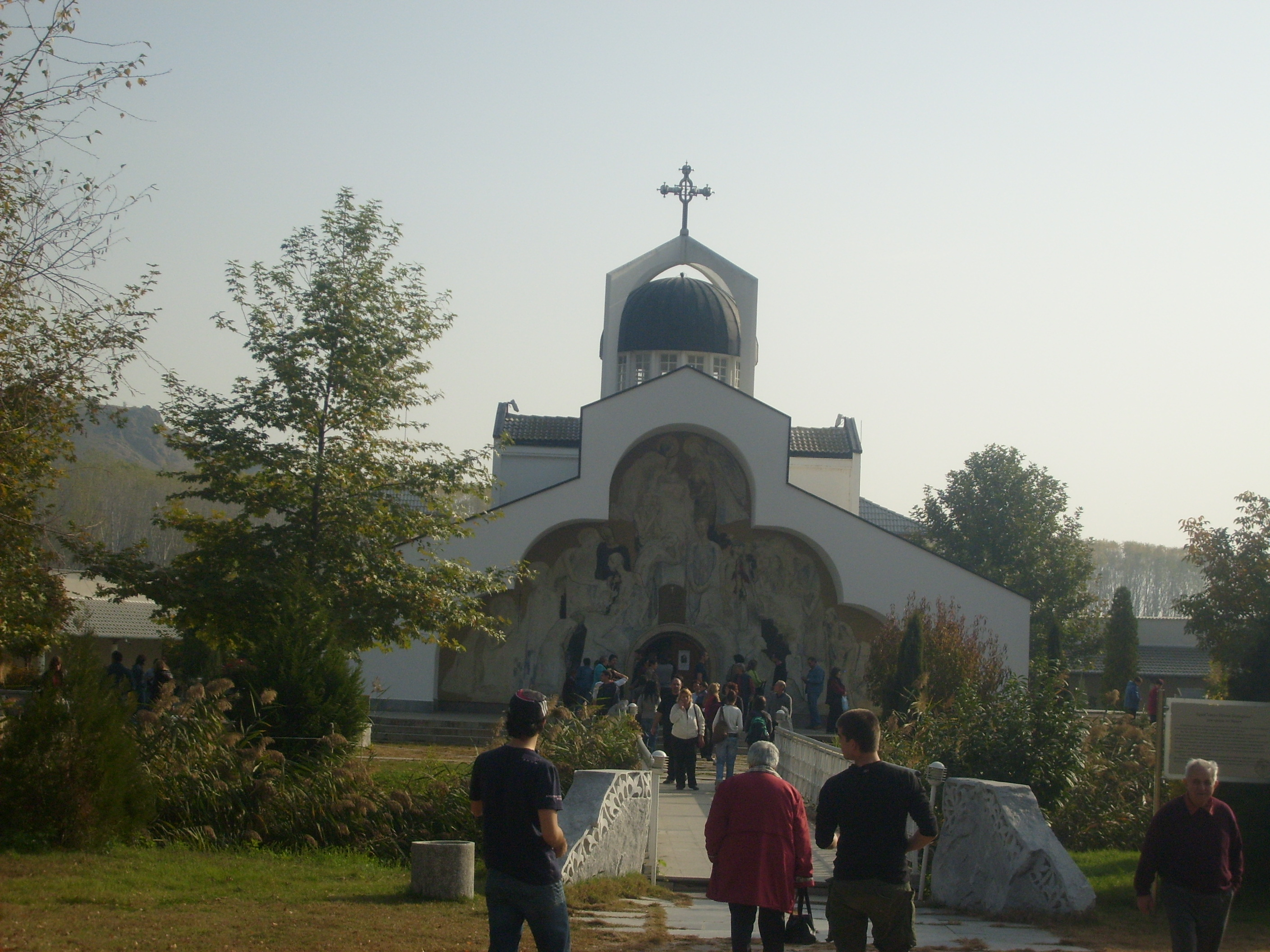
St Petka of Bulgaria, Baba Vanga's church and grave.

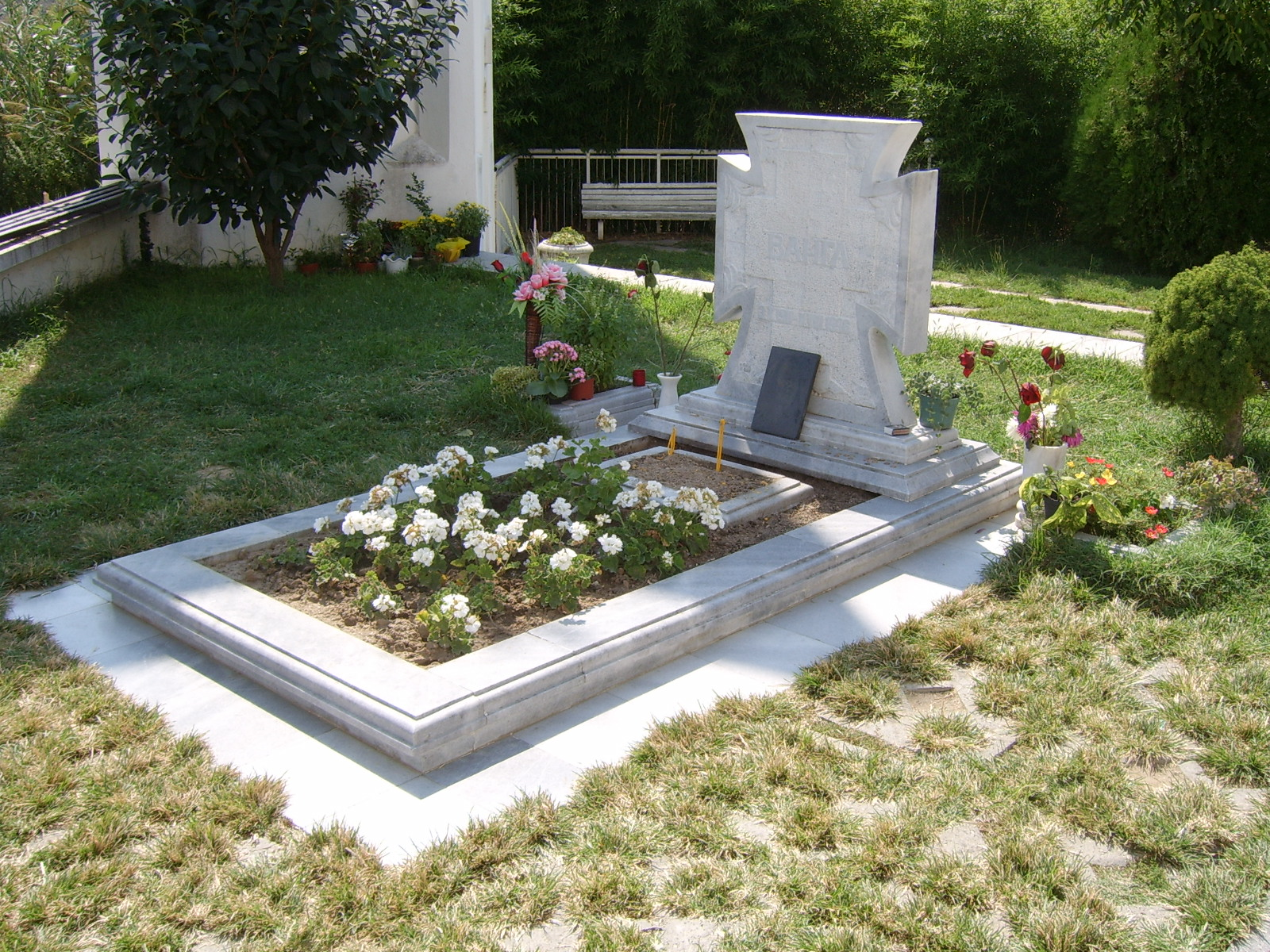
Baba Vanga's grave in Rupite, Bulgaria.

Vanga later moved to the village Rupite. She had Orthodox Christian beliefs. In 1990, she declared St. Petka as her patron saint and decided that a church dedicated to her should be constructed. In the 1990s, the church was built in Rupite with money left by her visitors, which was consecrated on 14 October 1994. Despite the consecration, it was controversial to the Bulgarian Orthodox Church because Vanga's image was painted inside and outside the church by the artist Svetlin Rusev, which contradicted with Orthodox canon law because only saints can be depicted.

On 11 August 1996, Vanga died from breast cancer. She was buried near her church.

== Predictions ==
There are no written records about her alleged predictions, but her followers nevertheless frequently attribute predictions to her.

Many of the people who were close to her have stated that she never made some of the predictions attributed to her.

Some predictions attributed to her by her followers include:

- The beginning of World War II
- Indira Gandhi's assassination
- The date of her own death
- The 1985 Northern Bulgaria earthquake
- The dissolution of the Soviet Union
- The election of Boris Yeltsin
- The Kursk submarine disaster
- September 11 attacks
- The election of an African-American as the 44th president of the United States

Some predictions that have proven to be false include:

- The 1994 FIFA World Cup final would be played between two teams beginning with B
- A nuclear war, between 2010 and 2016, which would lead to the abandonment of Europe
- The 44th president of the United States was the "last US president"

== Legacy ==
In 1976, a Bulgarian documentary about Vanga, directed by Bulgarian anthropologist Nevena Tosheva, called Phenomenon (Bulgarian: Феномен), was released, which had limited screenings at the time. Her niece Krasimira Stoyanova, who was close to her, published a biographical book about her named Vanga in Bulgarian in 1989. In the 1990s, multiple Russian-language editions of the book were published in the Soviet Union, with titles such as The Bulgarian Prophet Vanga (Russian: Болгарская пророчица Ванга) and Vanga, Confessions of a Blind Clairvoyant (Russian: Ванга, исповедь слепой ясновидящей).

Fulfilling Vanga's last will and testament, her Petrich house was turned into a museum, which opened its doors for visitors on 5 May 2008. Her Rupite house was also opened for visitors on 25 March 2014.

In 2012, Vanga was posthumously awarded the title "Honorary Citizen" by the Municipal Council of Petrich.

Vanga's alleged predictions and persona have remained popular in parts of Southeast Europe, primarily Bulgaria and North Macedonia, as well as parts of Eastern Europe, especially Russia. "The Great Encyclopedia of Vanga" is a Russian online project dedicated to her. In the 2010s, three Russian documentaries What Vanga was silent about (Russian: О чём молчала), Vanga: the seen and unseen world (Russian: Ванга: Мир видимый и невидимый), and Vanga the Great (Russian: Великая Ванга), were released. Vangelia, a Russian-language 24-episode TV series with elements of mysticism, was commissioned in 2013 by Channel One Russia.

In the 2020s, Vanga's persona has continued to grow on the Internet.

== See also ==
- Cheiro
- Edgar Cayce
- Eschatology
- Eugenia Davitashvili (Djuna)
- Nostradamus
- Pythia, the Oracle of Delphi
- Slava Sevryukova
- Vlaycho Zhechev
