= Lado Davydov =

Hero of the Soviet Union (1924–1987)

- Ладо Давыдов
- Davydov as pictured by the Soviet Red Army
- Born: 18 August 1924; Vladikavkaz, USSR
- Died: 30 July 1987 (aged 62); Moscow, USSR
- Burial place: Pyatnitskoye Cemetery
- Military career
- Allegiance: Soviet Union
- Branch: Red Army
- Service years: 1942–1945
- Rank: Sergeant
- Unit: 210th separate reconnaissance company
- Conflicts: World War II; Battle of the Caucasus; 1943 Novorossiysk Operation; Operation Bagration
- Awards: Hero of the Soviet Union; Order of Lenin; Order of the Patriotic War, 1st Class; Medal "For Courage"

Lado Shirinshayevich Davydov (Russian: Ладо Шириншаевич Давыдов) (18 August 1924 – 30 July 1987), also known simply as Lado Davydov (Russian: Ладо Давыдов) was an Assyrian Soviet soldier during the Second World War. He is most well known for being decorated with Hero of the Soviet Union, and being one of only two Assyrians to have received the medal, alongside Armenian Assyrian Sergey Sarkhoshev.

Born in 1924, Davydov's family was originally from Iran and had settled in Russia after fleeing the Assyrian genocide. He joined the Red Army in 1941 and was awarded in 1944 after attaining a document outlining German defenses in Belarus.

== Early life ==
Davydov was born on August 18, 1924, to an ethnically Assyrian family in Vladikavkaz (in what is now North Ossetia–Alania). His family had fled the Assyrian genocide from Iran and moved further north into the Russian area, where his father, Shirinsha Davydov, would work as a shoemaker. Davydov himself worked as a shoemaker from an early age, having only completed four grades of secondary school and shortly afterwards leaving to work at a tannery.

== Military service ==
Davydov first joined the Red Army in 1941 as a volunteer, graduating from regimental school in Tsagveri. His military involvement came during a time when Assyrians were met with much repression under the Stalinist government. His first entry into combat would be the following year, serving as a scout in the reconnaissance company for a Rifle Division in the 56th Army. He would serve as part of reconnaissance for the rest of the war period.

Davydov was part of the North Caucasus Front when he was sent into combat on a defense mission in Krasnodar in 1942. After a bullet mortally wounded his commander, he took command of what was left of his brigade and continued the defense, even after he was wounded. After losing consciousness, Davydov would spend the rest of that autumn being treated for his wounds.

After finishing treatment, Davydov would be reassigned to the 255th Naval Infantry Brigade of the 18th Army and stationed near Novorossiysk. He would be nearly killed when snipers discovered him and shot him just above his heart, and would once again be sent to treatment. Throughout 1943, Davydov would take part in many missions with his brigade, including a landing in Myskhako, capturing an enemy airfield near Malaya Zemlya, and liberating Novorossiysk in September of that year.

In June 1944, as part of the 1st Baltic Front, Davydov was in charge of reconnaissance of the Daugava River, reaching the village of Sharipino (Vitebsk region of Belarus) and leading an attack on 30 Nazi German soldiers. Davydov had personally shot a soldier and was able to recover a briefcase outlining the German defense of the region. Based on this, he was awarded the Hero of the Soviet Union later that year, one of only two Assyrians to have ever received the title.

== Personal life ==
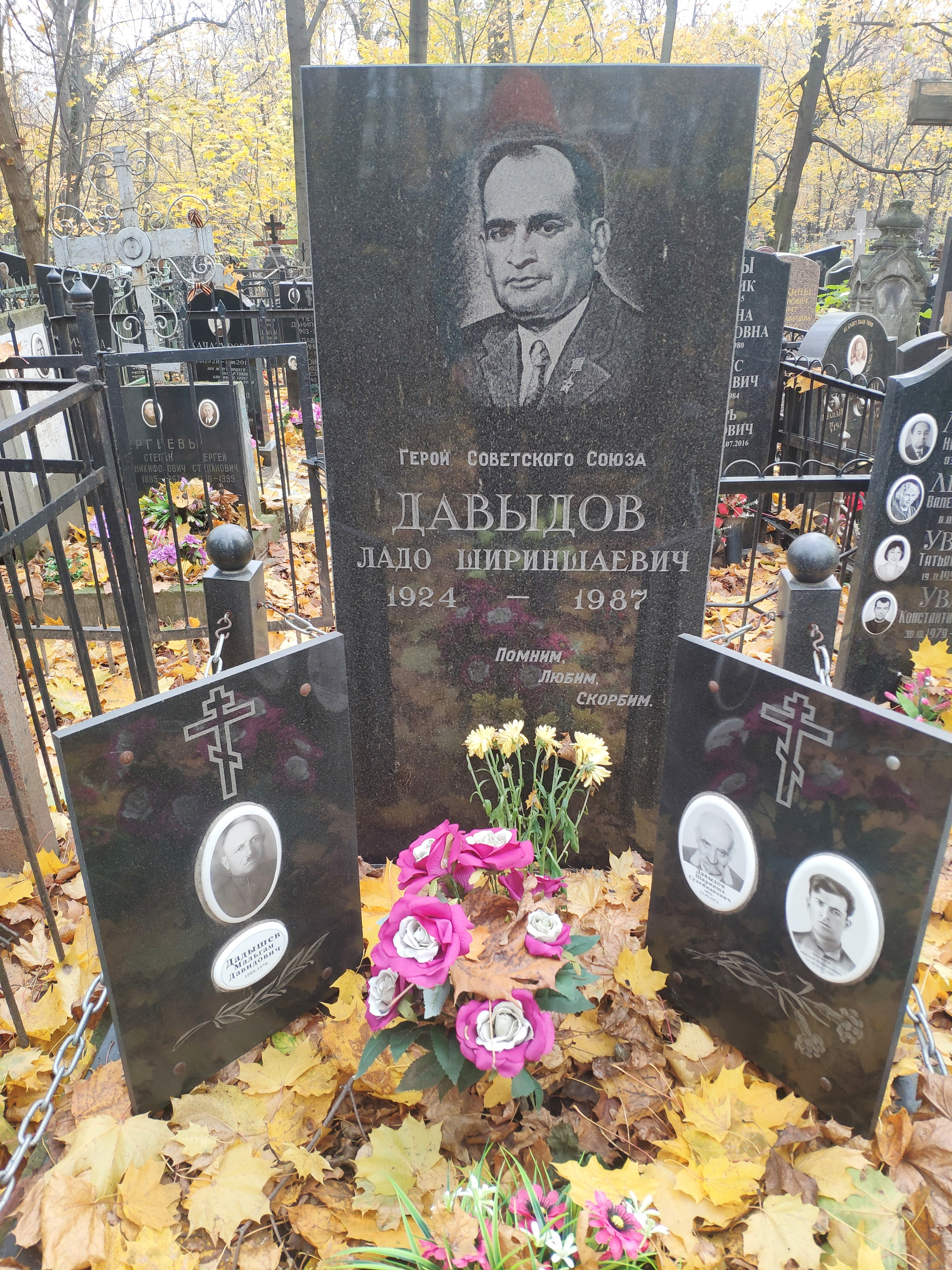
Davidov's grave in Pyatnitskoye Cemetery in Moscow

After the end of WWII, Davydov was discharged from military service and worked as a foreman in a shoe factory. He would later set up his own independent shoe shop near Moscow Yaroslavsky railway station, where he would work for the rest of his life. In 1985, a thief attempted to steal his Hero's Star and he was seriously injured, but he survived and his real Hero's Star was still at his house.

Davydov married an Assyrian woman from the same tribe as him (Diz tribe), Vartanush (Tatiana) Nikolaevna, and had two daughters named Rita and Lyudmila. He spoke many languages, namely Russian, Ossetian, Georgian, Armenian, and Assyrian Neo-Aramaic.

Davydov died in Moscow on 30 July 1987. His grave is located in the Pyatnitskoye Cemetery in northern Moscow, and he is additionally memorialized in the Baikove Cemetery in Kyiv, Ukraine. He remains a key figure in his native village, having a secondary school named after him in 2017 and receiving the title of "Honorary Citizen" in the Russian-Assyrian village of Urmia.

== Awards ==
- Medal "For Courage", No. 4147 (11/16/1943)
- Gold Star of the Hero of the Soviet Union (7/22/1944)
- Order of Lenin (7/22/1944)
- Order of the Patriotic War, 1st class (3/11/1985)
- Honorary citizen of the Russian-Assyrian village of Urmia in Krasnodar Krai

== See also ==
- Assyrians in Russia
- Lists of Heroes of the Soviet Union
