= Eugenia Davitashvili =

Russian faith healer (1935–2015)

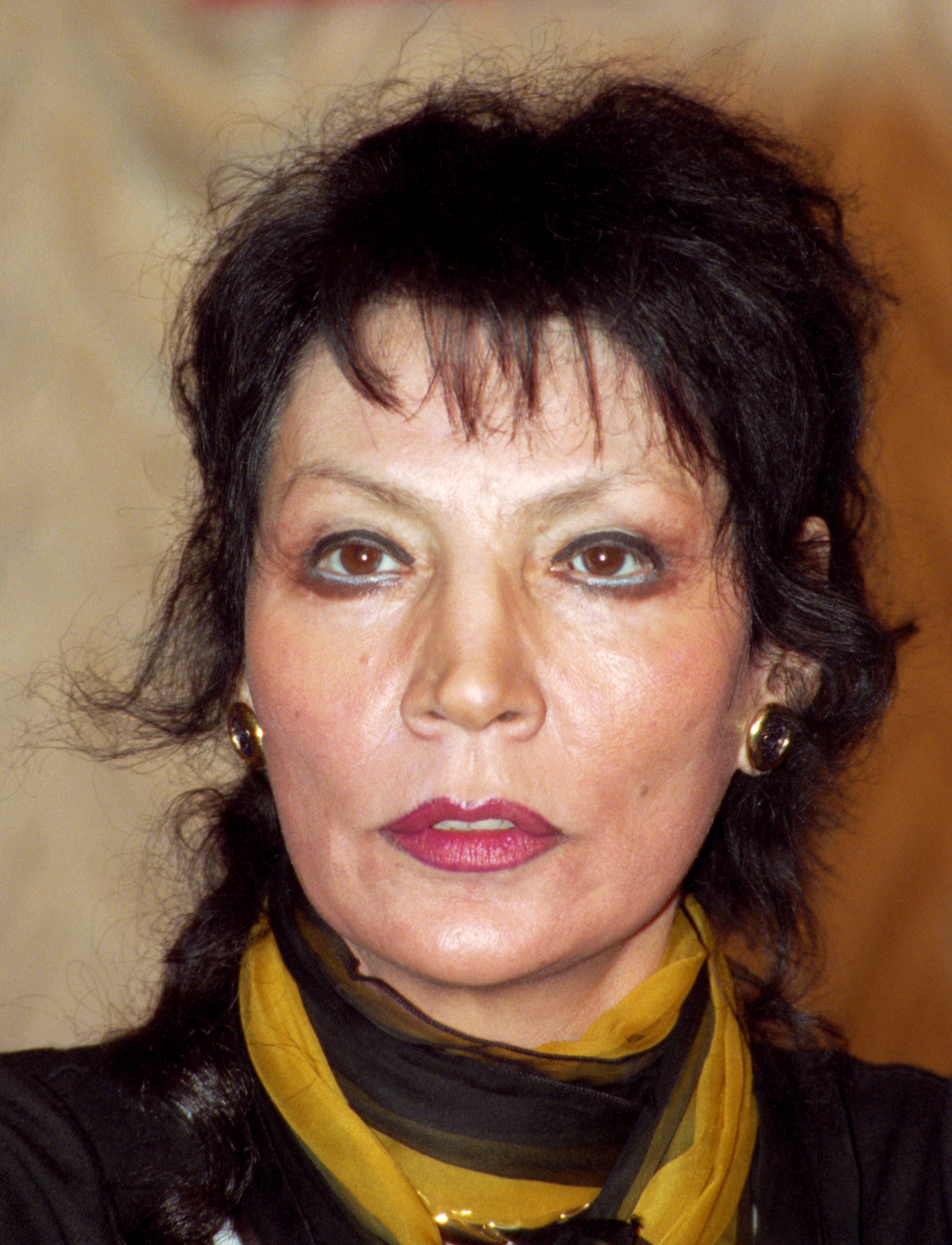
Djuna

Eugenia Yuvashevna Davitashvili, known as Djuna or Dzhuna (Georgian: ევგენია ჯუნა დავითაშვილი; Russian: Евге́ния Юва́шевна Давиташви́ли; née Sardis; c. 22 July 1935 (or 1949) – 8 June 2015), was a Russian faith healer, writer, painter and public figure of Iranian Assyrian descent who positioned herself as a healer, claiming the power to cure cancer, knit broken bodies, and prolong life beyond 100 years. She took her Georgian surname from her former husband.

== Biography ==
Eugenia Yuvashevna Davitashvili was born on or around 22 July 1935 or in 1949, in the village of Urmia in the Krasnodar Krai of Russia, back then in the Russian SFSR of the Soviet Union. Her father was an Iranian-born Assyrian immigrant and farmer named Yuvas Sardis (or Sariskov), and her mother was a Kuban Cossack woman named Anna (or Natasha) Grigoryevna. Eugenia was raised in poverty. According to one unconfirmed version of the story about the early mysterious and disputed life of Eugenia Davitashvili, during the Great Patriotic War, when the German Army advanced throughout Russia and invaded the Caucasus in the summer of 1942, Eugenia's village was bombed by the German Luftwaffe before it fell under German occupation for several months, and Eugenia herself claimed that she and other children from her village would often "dig in the field" for frozen potatoes and ears of maize when "food was very scarce" in the region and the people suffered from malnutrition, but then again, Eugenia also claimed to be born in 1949, four years after World War II had ended. Her date of birth and early life is unknown and surrounded by unconfirmed and possibly even false rumors. When she was still a young child, Eugenia's mother had died, and Eugenia was then adopted and raised by an adoptive family who had connections to the KGB officers. As an adult, Eugenia went to the Rostov College of Film and Television in Rostov-on-Don where she studied for two years, and then either dropped out and went to Moscow, or she graduated and was sent to Tbilisi in the Georgian SSR (today in Georgia), where she soon met her future husband, Iraklievich Davitashvili. Eugenia and Iraklievich Davitashvili had only one child: a son named Vakhtang "Vakho" Davitashvili, who died in 2001. It was in Tbilisi that Eugenia Davitashvili got a healing and psychic reputation. Eugenia claimed to be able to heal people, cure cancer, prolong life in humans above 100 years, and predict future events. For her psychic and healing powers, Eugenia became popular among astrologers, painters, writers, and poets. Eugenia herself wrote poetry and short stories occasionally and also was an astrologer.

== Politics ==
In 1995, she participated in the Russian legislative election as the head of the Juna Davitashvili Bloc. Her 0.47% of votes were not enough to give her any seat in the State Duma.

== Experiments ==
In 1983 and 1984, physicist and psi researcher, Russell Targ, his daughter Elisabeth Targ, and Keith Harary visited the Soviet Union as guests of the Soviet Academy of Sciences. In Moscow they were able to discuss remote viewing research with Russian scientists, visit psychics, including Davitashvili, and allegedly even carry out with her some remote viewing experiments between Moscow and San Francisco.

== Death ==
Davitashvili died in Moscow on 8 June 2015, two days after she fell into a coma, according to her close friend and actor Stanislav Sadalsky. She was buried next to her son.

== See also ==
- Baba Vanga
