= Aleksandr Alkhazov =

Russian footballer

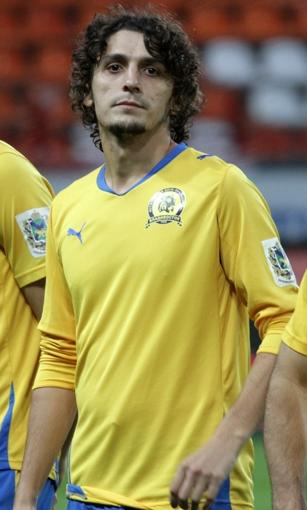
- Alkhazov with Luch-Energiya in 2011

Personal information
- Full name: Aleksandr Nikolayevich Alkhazov
- Date of birth: 27 May 1984 (age 42)
- Place of birth: Urmia, Krasnodar Krai, Russian SFSR
- Height: 1.77 m (5 ft 10 in)
- Position: Forward

Team information
- Current team: FC Khimki (assistant coach)

Youth career
- FC Rostselmash Rostov-on-Don

Senior career*
Years	Team	Apps	(Gls)
2003–2005	FC Rostov	29	(5)
2006	FC Spartak Nizhny Novgorod	37	(8)
2007	FC KAMAZ Naberezhnye Chelny	32	(9)
2008	FC Zvezda Irkutsk	23	(4)
2009	FC KAMAZ Naberezhnye Chelny	10	(1)
2010	FC Krylia Sovetov Samara	8	(1)
2010	→ FC Alania Vladikavkaz (loan)	2	(0)
2011–2012	FC Luch-Energiya Vladivostok	44	(10)
2012–2013	FC Shinnik Yaroslavl	21	(6)
2013–2015	FC Volgar Astrakhan	95	(39)
2016	FC Okzhetpes	4	(0)
2016–2017	FC Mordovia Saransk	28	(4)
2017–2018	FC Fakel Voronezh	17	(2)
2019–2020	FC Olimp Khimki	10	(1)
2020–2021	FC Olimp-Dolgoprudny	22	(8)
2023	FC Khimki-M	0	(0)

International career
2004	Russia U-21	4	(0)

Managerial career
- 2022–2024: FC Khimki (analyst)
- 2024–: FC Khimki (assistant)
- * Club domestic league appearances and goals

Aleksandr Nikolayevich Alkhazov (Russian: Александр Николаевич Алхазов; born 27 May 1984) is a Russian professional football coach and a former player of Assyrian ethnic origin. He is an assistant coach with FC Khimki.

== Career ==
He made his debut in the Russian Premier League in 2003 for FC Rostov.

Alkhazov left FC Okzhetpes by mutual consent on 21 June 2016.
