= Urmia, Krasnodar Krai =

Urmia Урмия
- Selo
- Interactive map of Urmia
- Location of Urmia Urmia (European Russia) Urmia (Russia)
- Coordinates: 44.8544°N 40.8585°E
- Country: Russia
- Federal subject: Krasnodar Krai
- Administrative district: Kurganinsky District
- Founded: 1924
- Elevation: 215 m (705 ft)

Population (2021 Census)
  - Total: 585
  - Estimate (2010): 741 (+26.7%)
- Time zone: UTC+3 (MSK)
- Postal code: 352418
- OKTMO ID: 03627413111

Urmia (Russian: Урмия, Syriac: ܐܘܪܡܝܐ) is a rural locality (a selo) in Kurganinsky District of Krasnodar Krai, Russia. The village was founded in 1924 by Assyrian refugees from the Lake Urmia region, in present day Iran. Today it is the only majority settlement of Assyrians in Russia.

== Demographics ==
As of the 2021 Russian census the village had a population of 585, a decrease compared to the previous census in 2010 when 741 people were said to be living in the village.

== Notable people ==
- Aleksandr Alkhazov (born 1984) professional football coach, former player
- Eugenia Davitashvili (1935–2015), faith healer, writer
