= All-Russian Union of Assyrians "Khoyad-Atur" =

Assyrian organization in Soviet Union (1924–28)

The All-Russian Union of Assyrians "Khoyad-Atur" (Russian: Всероссийский Союз Ассирийцев «Хояд-Атур», abbreviated ВСА/VSA), also called the Union of Assyrians, Residents in the Territory of RSFSR "Khoyad-Atur" (Russian: Союз Ассирийцев, проживающих на территории РСФСР «Хояд-Атур»), was an organization of Assyrian people in the Soviet Union from 1924 to 1928, with headquarters in Moscow. The organization worked for the upliftment of the Assyrian immigrant community and ran a number of economic enterprises. The financial management of the organization was complicated, and eventually led to its closure after four years of activity.

== Initiative group ==
Khoyad-Atur was formed in October 1924 by Assyrians from Turkey and Persia. Before the formal launch of the All-Russian Union of Assyrians "Khoyad-Atur", there was an initiative group working towards its establishment. Among the individuals active in the work to set up the organization were A.M. Aturi from Transcaucasus (former editor of the revolutionary newspaper Nakusha, organizer of the Assyrian Proletkult, school and for the Caucasus Bureau), Vladimir Revazov from Kharkov (teacher of evening courses for Assyrians), Isaak Aleksandrov (from Slaviansk) and V.T. Kochoev (worker).

In June 1924 the Assyrian initiative group contacted the Department of Nationalities of the All-Russian Central Executive Committee, requesting support for forming a national Assyrian association. On July 10, 1924, the head of the Department of Nationalities Gustav Klinger sent a message to the Central Administrative Department of the People's Commissariat of Internal Affairs (NKVD) calling for a speedy approval of the request of the Assyrian initiative group. On July 21, 1924, the initiative group sent a letter to the Presidium of the All-Russian Central Executive Committee, formally requesting approval to form a national association. The letter claimed that there were more than 80,000 Assyrians, immigrants from Turkey and Persia, living in the Soviet Union (this number was probably inflated, per Danilova [2005] in order to obtain the approval from the Soviet government).

The draft charter of the organization defined that the headquarters of the organization would be located in Moscow, where its Presidium (later renamed the Board) would be based. The highest decision-making organ would be the All-Russian congress, at which the Presidium would be elected. The first paragraph of the draft charter of the organization mentioned 'protection of the interests of the Assyrians', a wording that caused disagreement in the Administrative Department of the Moscow City Soviet (an entity that should register the charter).

== Foundation ==
On October 21, 1924, the NKVD of the RSFSR approved the charter of Khoyad-Atur. The Soviet authorities agreed that the organization could use the name Khoyad-Atur - 'Khoyad' meaning 'association' and 'atur' being a self-designation of the Assyrians.

As no All-Russian congress had been held, a provisional Presidium constituted the leadership of the organization until a congress could be held. The founding chairman of the organization was A. Bit-Alkhaz, and its secretary was Revazov. Aleksander Bit-Shumum, chairman of House of the Peoples of the East in Kiev, was a member of the board of Khoyad-Atur. Khoyad-Atur was founded to help Assyrian immigrants adapt to the new conditions in Soviet Russia, eliminate illiteracy and provide trainings in trades needed in urban areas for people with rural backgrounds. Khoyad-Atur had regional branches, which were divided into departments - administrative and economic, organizational and instructional, financial, cultural and educational, etc.) - sub-departments and sections. The organization struggled to maintain a steady membership, by October 1925 it only had some 400 registered members.

A number of industrial, commercial and transport enterprises were placed at the disposal of Khoyad-Atur - including shoe polish and repair workshops, shoe cleaning stations, warehouses and grocery stores, as well as a cast-iron foundry plant in Veshnyaki. The enterprises allowed for fundraising opportunities to the organization as well as a source of income for its members. During the initial period of Khoyad-Atur's existence the leadership of the organization was largely occupied with the management of these economic enterprises, rather than other social, cultural or political activities.

== Shoe polishing conflicts ==
Very soon after its foundation Khoyad-Atur signed a lease agreement with the land department of the Moscow Economic Committee, in order to distribute shoe polishing stations in the Soviet capital to the Assyrian community members. Many Assyrian immigrants in the city depended on this economic activity as their sole source of income. Spots were generally subleased to members of the organization, and Khoyad-Atur sought to utilize the offers of subleased shoe polishing stations as a mechanism to increase its membership. As of 1925, 725 such locations were subleased in the city. But the distribution process was marred with irregularities, with controversies of accusations of bribery in the allocation process. Disputes over shoe polishing station allocations turned into violent conflicts (even along tribal lines), causing significant discontent in the community.

In April 1925 Bit-Alkhaz and Revazov suffered repression and were removed from the board of the organization. From there on Mikhail Badalov, a 23-year-old student at the Communist University of the Toilers of the East, served as chairman until a congress could be held. The audit commission would state that regarding the activities of Khoyad-Atur in 1925, there were gross deficiencies in the record keeping of the shoe cleaning section.

== First All-Russian Congress ==
The first (and only) congress of Khoyad-Atur was held in Moscow on December 7–13, 1925. The Council of People's Commissars, following a request from the NKVD, allocated 6,000 rubles to support the holding of the event.

There were 34 delegates at the event (an amount significantly lower than the 80 delegates initially expected). 12 identified delegates came from the Russian SFSR (Moscow 4, Leningrad 2, Rostov-on-Don 2, Armavir 1, Labinsk 1, Voronezh 1, Vladimir 1), 7 delegates from the Georgian SSR, 6 from the Ukrainian SSR (Kiev 2, Kharkov 2, Slaviansk 1, Stalin 1, Yekatrinoslav 1), 4 delegates from the Armenian SSR and 2 delegates from the Azerbaijani SSR. Two groups dominated the congress - a group of Assyrians from Tiflis (F. Aturaya, S. Bit-Lazar and V. Bit-Varda) and a group from Yerevan and North Caucasus (Samson Piraev, A. Givargizov, E. Isaev and others).

There were also 14 guests at the event. Invitations to attend the congress had been sent to various entities such as the Department of Nationalities of the All-Russian Central Executive Committee, the People's Commissariat of Foreign Affairs, and the People's Commissariat of Education, Moscow City Soviet, the Department of National Minorities of the Central Committee of the Communist Party of the Russian Communist Party (Bolsheviks) and the Eastern Department of the Executive Committee of the Communist International.

In the debates at the Moscow congress there were repeated calls, from delegates from North Caucasus, Georgia, Armenia, Azerbaijan and Ukraine, calling for the organization to adopt a policy of seeking Soviet government support to unite the Assyrian population through resettlement into a single territory. Subsequently, the two main decisions of the Khoyad-Atur congress were to issue requests to the Soviet government to provide agricultural lands and a single compact territory for residence of all Assyrians in the Soviet Union. Samson Piraev was elected new chairman of the organization, taking into consideration his experience in party work and leadership roles in party committees in North Caucasus. S. Bit-Lazar and V. Bit-Varda would serve as secretaries of the organization.

== After the Moscow congress ==
On January 13, 1926, Khoyad-Atur, responding to a request for information from the People's Commissariat of the Workers and Peasants Inspectorate, estimated the Assyrian population to consist of some 16,000 people in the Russian SFSR, 9,000 in the Ukrainian SSR, 6,000 in the Georgian SSR, 4,000 in the Armenian SSR, and 3,000 in the Azerbaijani SSR. This estimate was much higher than the number of Assyrians recorded in the 1926 Soviet census, largely as a result of the majority of Assyrians not yet being Soviet citizens at the time.

By January 1926 Khoyad-Atur ran nine economic enterprises - grocery stores, shoe polish shops, canteens, a transport enterprise and the Veshnyaki foundry. The organization incurred significant debts due from most of its failed business ventures. On July 22, 1926, the Khoyad-Atur board expanded its statutory authority, and a number of its economic enterprises that had gone bankrupt were closed down. However, this move did not improve the dire financial situation of the organization.

As of 1926 the organization had some 2,000 registered members. The twelve tribes present in the Assyrian community in the Soviet Union had de facto representation within Khoyad-Atur, and the organization would from time to time negotiate with the heads of the different tribes. In reports the organization leadership complained about the persistence of remnants of feudal and traditionalist culture and morals within the Assyrian community and the lack of integration with Soviet society.

On November 24, 1926, Khoyad-Atur issued a letter to Semyon Dimanstein, the head of the Department of National Minorities of the Central Committee of the All-Union Communist Party (Bolsheviks), urging the party to allow for legal immigration of Assyrians from Mesopotamia to resettle in the Soviet Union and to instruct border authorities and security agencies not to treat the Assyrians as illegal immigrants.

== Land allocation ==
The Soviet government authorities did not respond to the request of the December 1925 Khoyad-Atur congress to set up a single compact territory for the Assyrians inside the Soviet Union. But the Soviet government authorities were open to allocation of agricultural lands to the Assyrians. From December 1926 until 1937 there would be intermittent campaigns of agricultural land allocations to Assyrians. On December 18, 1926, the Council of People's Commissars of the RSFSR adopted a resolution calling for distribution of agricultural lands. The People's Commissariat of Agriculture drew up plans for resettlement in the Gelendzhik Raion and the Volga region. The Khoyad-Atur leadership was mainly interested in the Gelendzhik area on the Black Sea, as the climate and agricultural conditions were similar to those of the Assyrian homelands. By late 1927 the Soviet government had allocated some 20,700 dessiatines in the Gelendzhik area, for a planned resettlement of 6,740 people.

Khoyad-Atur held meetings with the heads of each of the 12 Assyrian tribes, and reportedly managed to reach agreement with all except the Jilbai tribe. From 1927 onward the organization sought to mobilize Assyrians to move to the new agricultural lands, but the response from community members was largely meagre as most urban residents did not wish to move out of the cities into collective agriculture. There were also reports indicating that the agricultural resettlement campaign was badly organized by Khoyad-Atur. Moreover, the organization was only allowed to mobilize resettlement within the RSFSR, and thus could not recruit agricultural settlers from the Assyrian populations in the other Soviet republics.

== Liquidation ==
The economic situation of the organization continued to be difficult, eventually leading to its demise in 1928. A resolution of the NKVD of the Russian SFSR dated May 10, 1928, ordered the liquidation of Khoyad-Atur. Khoyad-Atur would be replaced by the All-Russian Society of Working Assyrians "Khayadta" in July 1928. Khayadta had a similar profile to Khoyad-Atur.
