= Sergey Sarkhoshev =

Sergey Abramovich Sarkhoshev (Russian: Сергей Абрамович Сархошев; September 13, 1913 – January 6, 1991) was a Soviet World War II soldier, Hero of the Soviet Union. He was an Armenian Assyrian and one of the only two Assyrians awarded the title of the Hero of the Soviet Union, another one being Lado Davydov. He was also awarded with several orders and medals.

He was born in the village of Arzni, now in Kotayk Province, Armenia.
