= Slava Sevryukova =

- Born: 1903; Nova Zagora, Bulgaria
- Died: 1991 (aged 87–88)
- Spouse: Stepan Sevryukov

Slava Sevryukova (Bulgarian: Слава Севрюкова, 1903–1991) was a Bulgarian psychotronic researcher. Following the fall of the Berlin Wall and the subsequent transition in Bulgaria, she gained recognition for her purported visionary and folk healing abilities.

== Life ==
Born in 1903 in Nova Zagora, Bulgaria, Slava Sevryukova descended from a middle-class family with a lineage rooted in traditional healing practices. At the age of 16, Slava married Stepan Sevryukov, who, having recovered from a severely injured leg during World War I, was impressed by her compassionate care for wounded soldiers. The family moved around the country and finally settled in the capital, where she established mutual contacts with the Bulgarian spiritual teacher Peter Deunov.

After the fall of communism, in 1990 she addressed the First Psychotronic Congress in Sofia. In her talk, she discussed her predictions for an advance in science after the year 2000, between 2025 and 2030, and spirituality from 2031 onward that would ultimately dissolve divisions among people and erase national borders.

Sevryukova died in her sleep in 1991.

== Work ==
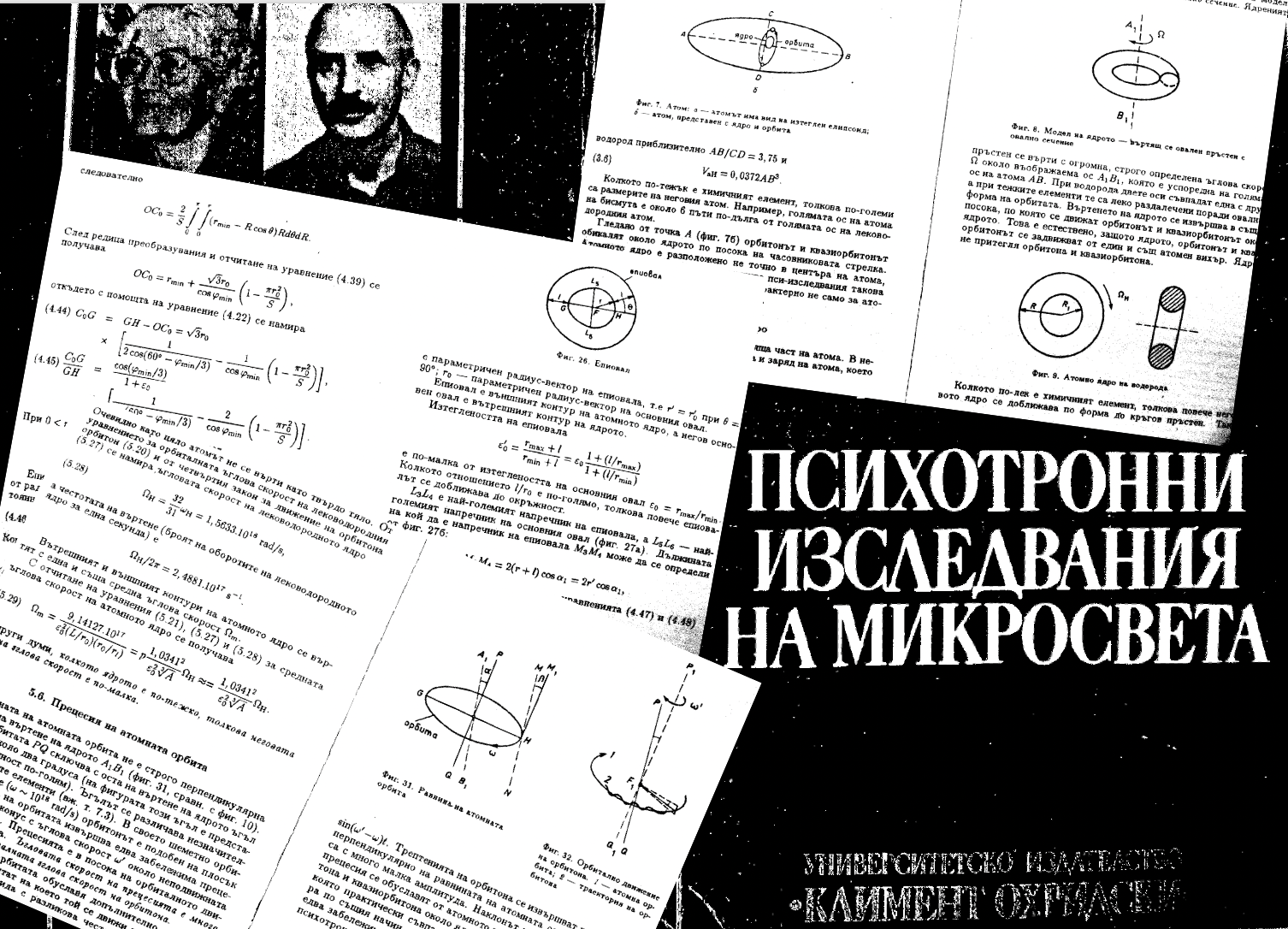
Sevryukova and Lozensky's monograph "Psychotronic Studies of the Microworld".

In 1963, collaborating with Assoc. Prof. Ivo Lozensky, Slava Sevryukova began psychotronic research employing what she described as a psi-wave emitted from brain cells, surpassing the speed of light in vacuum, and directly influencing the object. Utilizing this method, they used Sevryukova's "power of thought" to temporarily halt the movement of microscopic objects, study their internal composition and gather information on various properties such as dimensions, mass, speed etc. Their monograph, "Psychotronic Studies of the Microworld," spanning nine years of dedicated research since 1981, provides detailed quantitative data on their studies. It posits that the cosmos, whether on a micro or macro scale, consists of five fundamental elements: vortices, psions, cosmic moisture, cosmic salt, and cosmic prana. Vortices, serving as the primary psi-field, exert forces, capturing and rotating all particles of the primordial elements in a left helix.

Sevryukova and Lozenski initiated their exploration of the atomic realm with the study of the light hydrogen atom, progressing through the structural details of all elements until uranium. In their psychotronic model, atoms across all elements follow a common pattern—a rotating oval ring with an oval cross-section (a heavy nucleus) set in motion by the atomic vortex. The core, consisting of vast numbers psi-charges, generates a powerful psi-field amplifying the primary vortex, ultimately resulting in the formation of a dense atomic psi-field and the atom itself.

In 1989, at the Congress of the Polish Psychotronic Association in Warsaw, they presented their atomic model in the report titled "A Psychotronic model of the atom and atomic nuclei". According to their phycotronic studies, magnetic psions create a static psi-field that attract all psi-charge particles forming the crystal lattice of solids. Sevryukova claimed to have observed the arrangement of atoms on the surface of a silicon crystall psychotronically in 1978, seven years before a similar image was captured using a scanning tunneling microscope. In her work, Sevryukova also disputed Edwin Hubble's conception of the universe's expansion, positing instead that the universe pulsates, both expanding and contracting at different times.

== Legacy ==
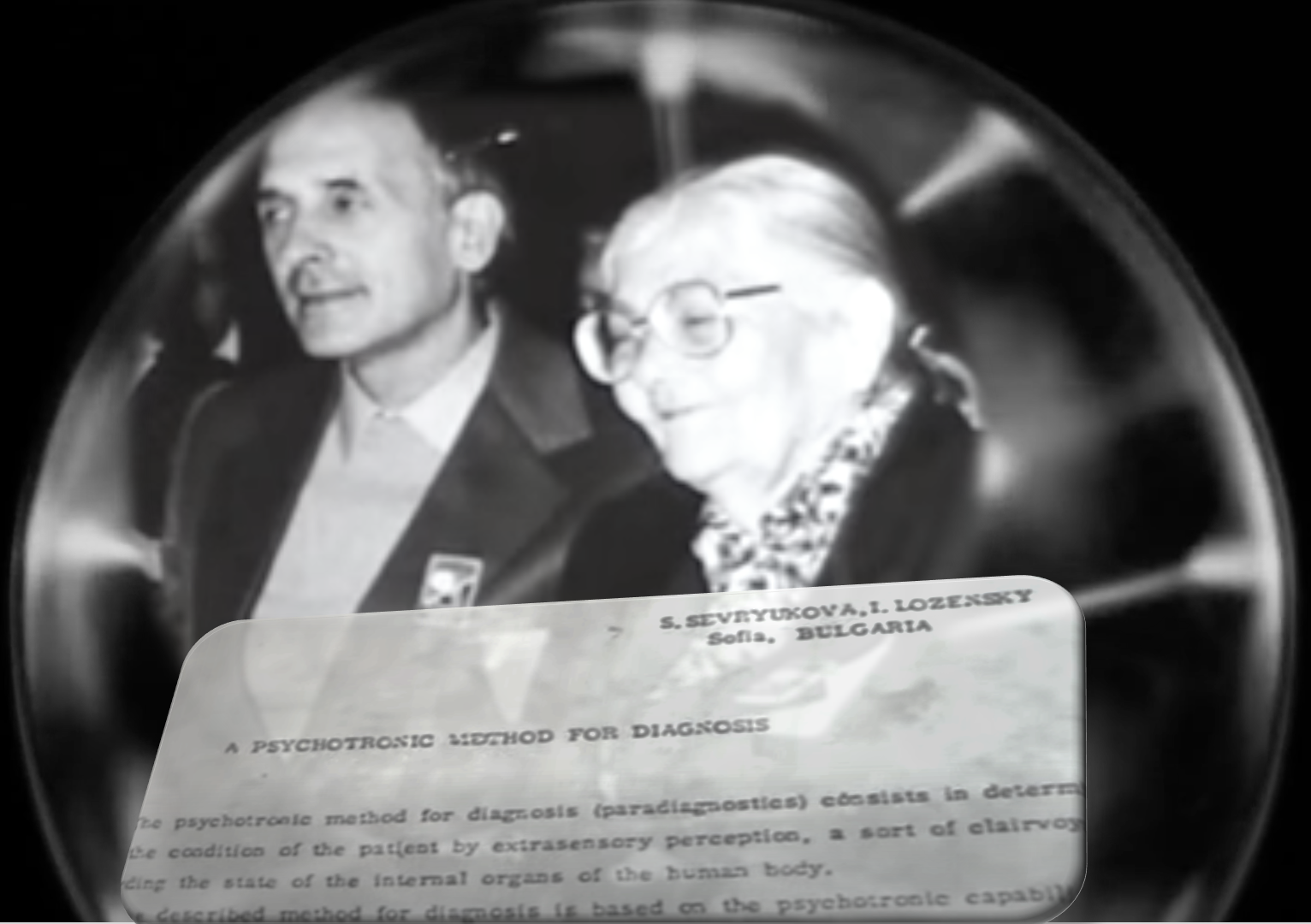
S. Sevryukova and Assoc. Prof. I. Lozenski.

Slava Sevryukova, alongside her assistant Assoc. Prof. Lozenski, received numerous invitations to participate in congresses, conferences, symposiums, and international events. Due to financial constraints, they managed to afford attending a few psychotronic conferences in Warsaw, Poland, by covering their own expenses given its proximity to Bulgaria. Despite invitations, such as the one in 1980 to the International Congress of Acupuncture in Palma de Mallorca, held under the patronage of the Spanish king, they were unable to attend due to a lack of organizational funds. However, they contributed to the American magazine Psi Research submitting a work on Man and Space. Their preference was to have their monograph published in Bulgaria first before reaching an international audience.

Throughout her career, Sevryukova and Lozenski published nine works in various magazines covering topics ranging from human organs, Earth's core, to electronic and technicals elements. Additionally, they hold three inventions with copyright certificates for the rapid determination of carbonate in rock samples. Slava Sevryukova became an associate of the Washington Psychotronic Center, an honorary member of the Association of Psychics of the former USSR, and was declared an honorary professor by the Spanish and Indian Academy of Sciences.

== See also ==
- Peter Deunov
- Vlaicho Zhechev
- Baba Vanga
