= Babyak =

Babyak Бабяк
- Village
- Location within Bulgaria
- Coordinates: 41°57′19″N 23°40′56″E
- Country: Bulgaria
- Province: Blagoevgrad Province
- Municipality: Belitsa

Government
  - Mayor: Shemsedin Baskov (DPS)

Area
  - Total: 16.662 km^{2} (6.433 sq mi)
- Elevation: 1,337 m (4,386 ft)

Population (15.12.2010)
  - Total: 781
- Time zone: UTC+2 (EET)
  - Summer (DST): UTC+3 (EEST)
- Postal Code: 2784
- Area code: 074404
- Website: https://web.archive.org/web/20111026023406/http://babiak.selo.bg/

Babyak (Bulgarian: Бабяк) is a village in the Belitsa Municipality in Blagoevgrad Province, Bulgaria, situated 15 km southwest of Belitsa in the foothills of the Rhodope Mountains and dispersed in several neighborhoods. As of 2010 it had a population of 781 people.

== History ==
A sanctuary from the Iron Age in a site, called "Mitesh" and an ancient village at the site "Pshenitseninata" are the oldest traces of live near the village. A Thracian marble plates representing Bendida, Zeus and Hera were found at an altar used till 5th century. A medieval necropolis and more than 1000 copper and silver Byzantine coins have been unearthed at a site named "Gogovo". Ruins from a medieval monastery "St Ekaterina" have been found at "Babyaska chuka". The village was mentioned in an Ottoman register from 1576 year.

== Population and ethnicity ==
In the book Ethnographie des Vilayets d'Andrinople, de Monastir et de Salonique in French the village was described as "village with 892 households and more than 2100 male inhabitants of pomak origin" as in 1873. In 1900 Vasil Kanchov wrote about a "village with more than 3600 people of pomak origin". In 1916 D. Gadzhanov noted about 4780 pomak people, living in Babyak. Since 1954 - 1955 some neighborhoods of the village have been separated from the village and the population decreased.

== Religion ==
The population is Muslim of Pomak origin. In 1972 started a renaming process of the people of non-Bulgarian (Islamic) names and more than 400 men formed resistance groups, who tried to reach Sofia and to protest against the renaming, but they were stopped and arrested. One old man died after the incident. There is a very old mosque from 17th century.

== Education and culture ==
There is one primary school "St. St. Cyril and Methodius", a kindergarten, a nursery and a cultural center with library.

== Transportation and utilities ==
The village is connected with the national road system by a fourth class municipal road through the villages Lyutovo and Kraishte. There are roads to the neighboring villages: Kuzyovo, Chereshovo and Ortsevo. The road between Babyak and Lyutovo is in excellent condition, but the other roads need improvement. The roads are mountainous, narrow and steep and very difficult in the winter. There are no other types of transportation. Electricity is provided to all the neighborhoods of the village by aerial wires. Home and mobile phones are provided. There is a central sewerage and local water supply. A post office and a grocery work daily. The police station is in the village hall.
