= Dagonovo =

Dagonovo Дагоново
- Village
- Location within Bulgaria
- Coordinates: 41°57′N 23°36′E
- Country: Bulgaria
- Province: Blagoevgrad Province
- Municipality: Belitsa

Government
  - Mayor: Ivan Barabunov (DPS)

Area
  - Total: 15,802 km^{2} (6,101 sq mi)
- Elevation: 1,110 m (3,640 ft)

Population (15-12-2010)
  - Total: 724
- GRAO
- Time zone: UTC+2 (EET)
  - Summer (DST): UTC+3 (EEST)
- Postal Code: 2779
- Area code: 074406

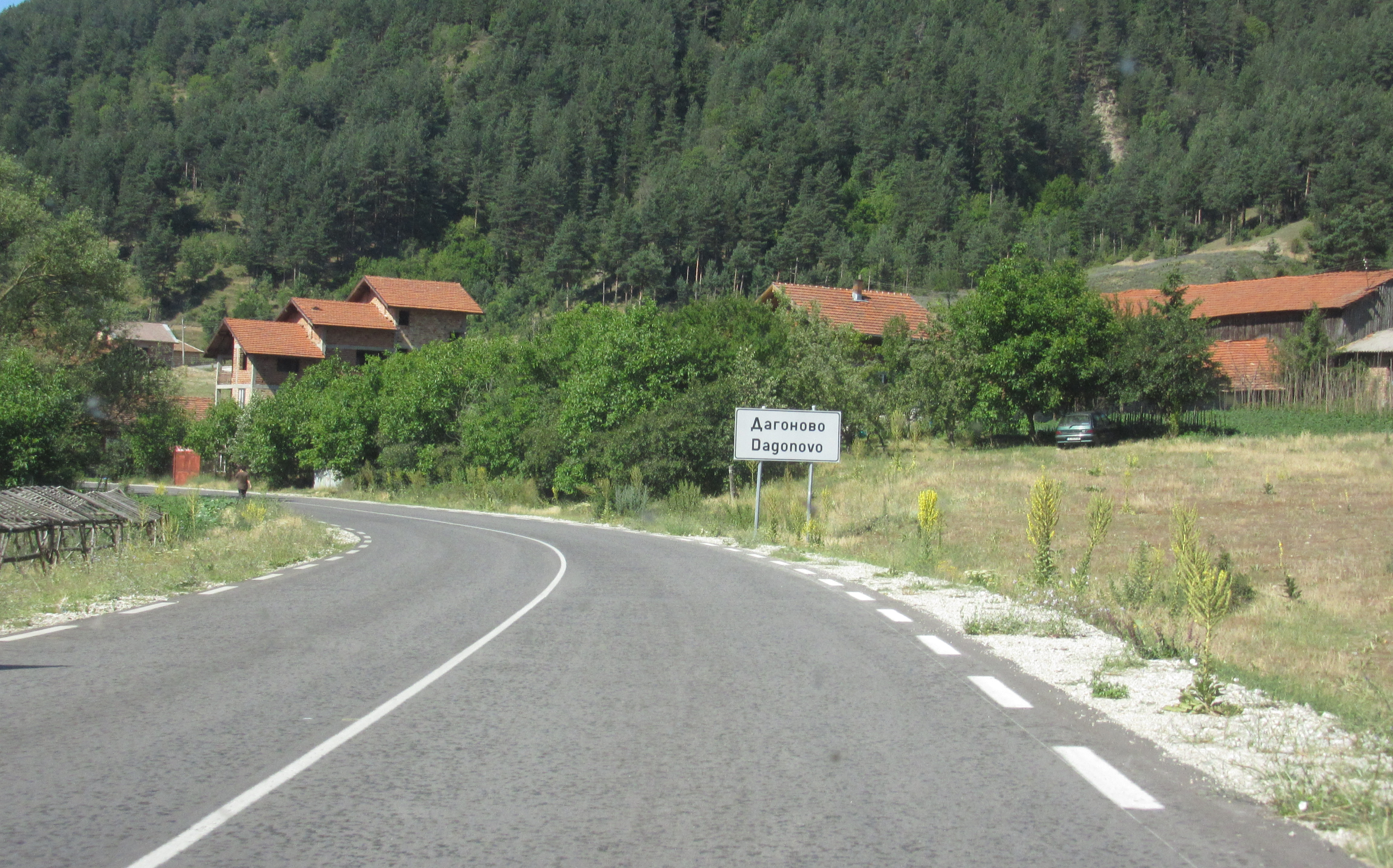
Dagonovo entrance on the road Velingrad-Razlog, Bulgaria

Dagonovo (Bulgarian: Дагоново) is a village in the municipality of Belitsa, in Blagoevgrad Province, Bulgaria. It is located approximately 8 kilometers east from Belitsa and 85 kilometers southeast from Sofia on the eastern bank of Mesta river. The village is situated less than 1 km east of the secondary road Razlog - Velingrad and on the Septemvri-Dobrinishte narrow gauge line.

Until 1955 the village was a neighborhood of Babyak. The population is Muslim of pomak origin. There is an elementary school "Petko R. Slaveikov" and a kindergarten. Electricity is provided by aerial wires. Drinking water is supplied from the lake "Ribno". There is a sewage draining system.
