= Razlog Valley =

Valley in Bulgaria

Coordinates: 41°52′N 23°30′E

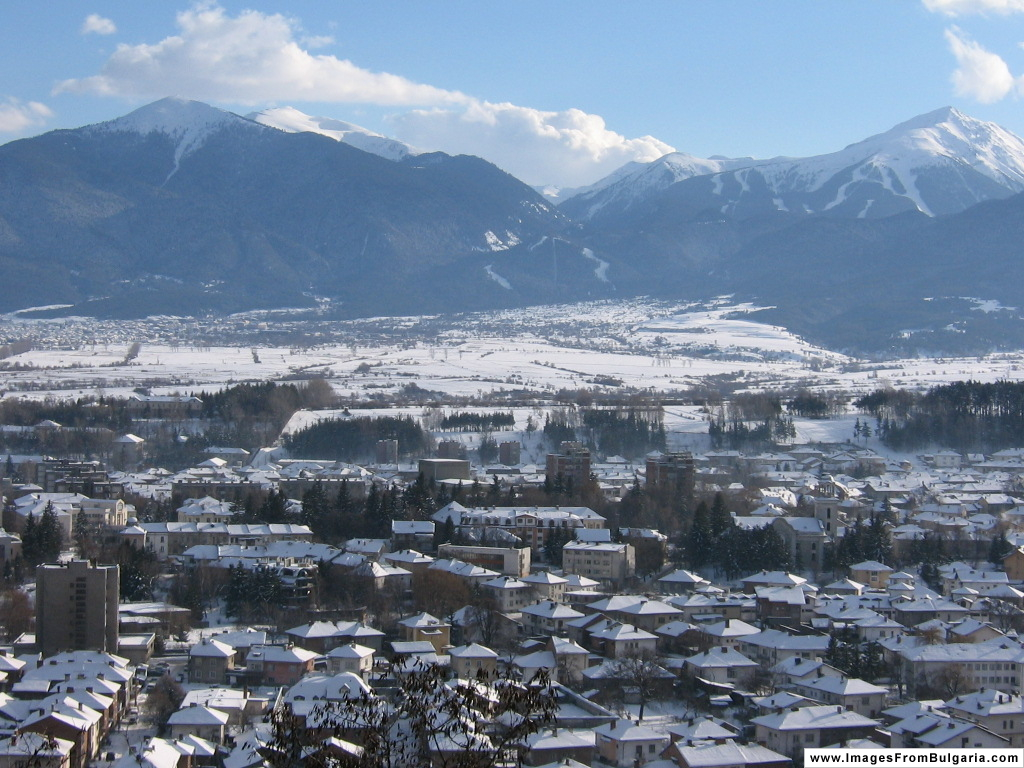
View of the valley and the town of Razlog with the mountains in the background

The Razlog Valley (Bulgarian: Разложка котловина, romanized: Razlozhka kotlovina) is a valley in southwestern Bulgaria, Blagoevgrad Province, containing the Razlog, Bansko, and Belitsa municipalities. It is bounded by the Rila Mountains to the north and northwest, the Pirin Mountains to the south and southwest, and the Rhodope Mountains to the east. The transitional continental Mediterranean climate and nature of the valley are influenced by both the high alpine mountain “walls” of Rila and Pirin and the vast and wild Rhodopes, and the warm Mediterranean climate of the Aegean Sea entering from the south via the Mesta river course.

It is home to Bansko, a renowned winter resort center and one of the top tourist destinations in Bulgaria. Another popular ski center is Semkovo.

The valley is a syncline representing a structural sedimentary basin with an average altitude of the valley bottom of more than 800 m. The highest mountain ridges surrounding the valley reach almost 3000 m, and are rich in glacial landforms. In its northeastern part, between Rila and the Rhodopes, is located the Belishko field, which is part of the valley. Within these limits from west-northwest to east-southeast, its length reaches 21 km and its average width is 12 km.

There are four towns - Bansko, Belitsa, Dobrinishte and Razlog - and many villages in the area, some of them being Banya, Bachevo, Dobarsko, Godlevo, Gorno Draglishte, Dolno Draglishte, Eleshnitsa, Kraishte, Gorno Kraishte. The town of Razlog was named after the region in 1923 and previously was known as Mehomiya.

The Razlog Valley has abundant water resources, including many tributaries of the Mesta River, as well as hot springs in the villages of Banya, Bachevo and Eleshnitsa and the Razhdavets and Katarino areas, with the temperature of some of the springs reaching 60 °C and the discharge 70-80 litres per second.
