= Galabovo, Blagoevgrad Province =

Galabovo Гълъбово
- Village
- Location within Bulgaria
- Coordinates: 41°58′N 23°40′E
- Country: Bulgaria
- Province: Blagoevgrad Province
- Municipality: Belitsa

Government
  - Suffragan mayor: Ibrahim Palev

Area
  - Total: 4,471 km^{2} (1,726 sq mi)
- Elevation: 1,472 m (4,829 ft)

Population (15-12-2010)
  - Total: 80
- GRAO
- Time zone: UTC+2 (EET)
  - Summer (DST): UTC+3 (EEST)
- Postal Code: 2789
- Area code: 074404

Galabovo or Gulubovo (Bulgarian: Гълъбово) is a small mountainous village in the municipality of Belitsa, in Blagoevgrad Province, Bulgaria. It is located approximately 18 kilometers west-northwest from Belitsa and 85 kilometers southeast from Sofia. As of 2010 it had a population of 80 people, all of them Muslim of pomak origin . The village is connected by road with Lyutovo and Kraishte and from Kraishte with Belitsa and the national road system. Electricity is provided by aerial wires.
