= Kraishte (disambiguation) =

Kraishte may refer to:

- Kraishte or Krajište, a geographical and historical region in Bulgaria and Serbia, with a very small part in North Macedonia
- Kraishte, Blagoevgrad Province, a village
- Kraishte, Dobrich Province, a village
- Gorno Kraishte, a village
