= Belitsa Municipality =

Belitsa Municipality Община Белица
- Municipality (Obshtina)
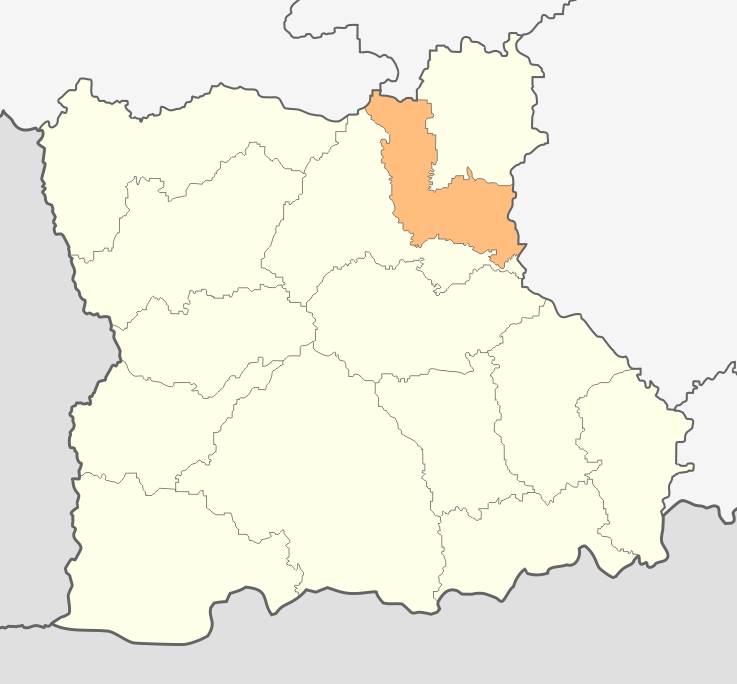
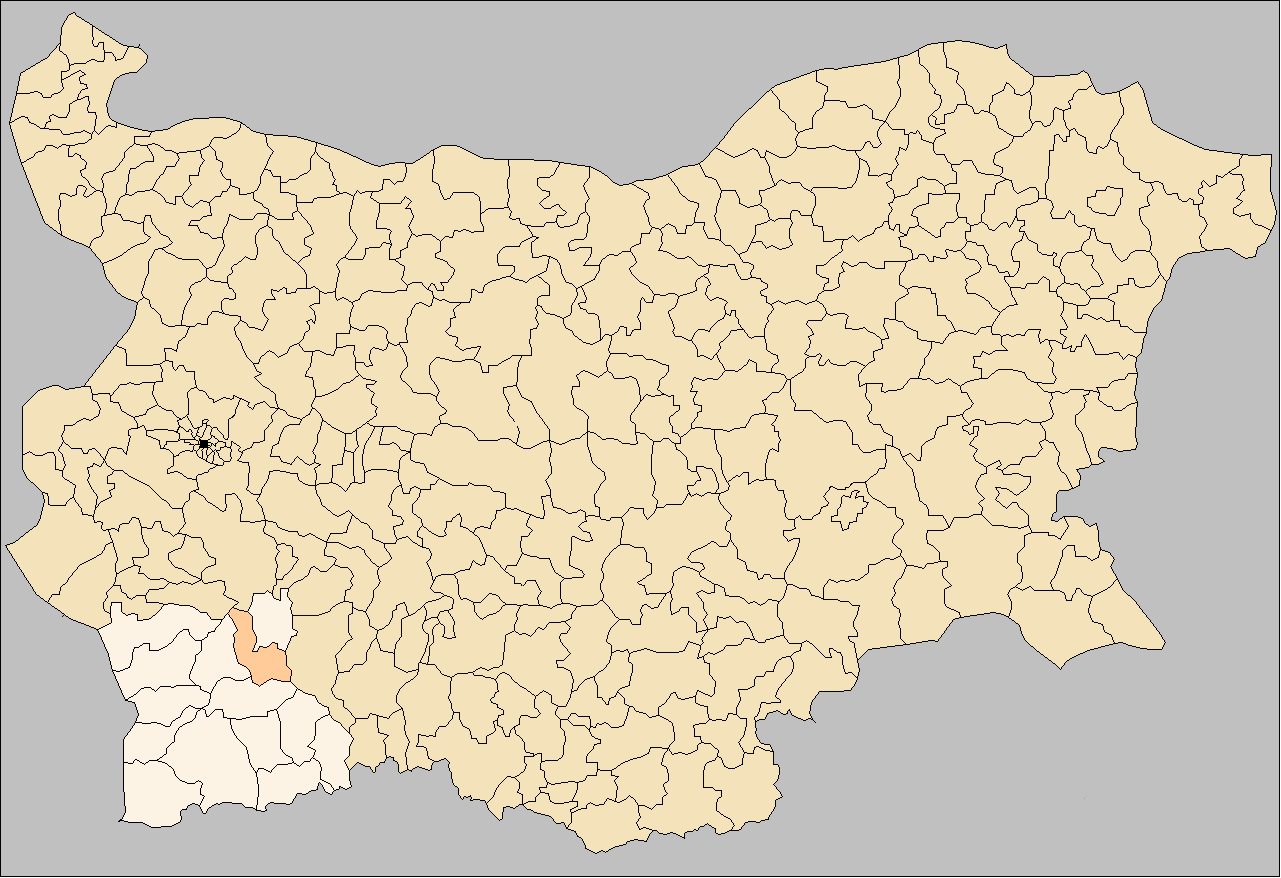
- Location in Blagoevgrad province Location on map of Bulgaria
- Coordinates: 41°57′N 23°34′E
- Country: Bulgaria
- Province (Oblast): Blagoevgrad
- Seat: Belitsa

Government
  - Mayor: Radoslav Revanski (DPS)

Area
  - Total: 293.54 km^{2} (113.34 sq mi)
- Elevation: 952 m (3,123 ft)

Population (2011)
  - Total: 9,927
  - Density: 33.82/km^{2} (87.59/sq mi)
- Demonym: Belichanin / pl. Belichani
- Time zone: UTC+2 (EET)
  - Summer (DST): UTC+3 (EEST)
- Website: www.belitsa.com

Belitsa Municipality (Bulgarian: Община Белица, Obshtina Belitsa) is located in the southwestern part of Bulgaria in the northeastern part of the Blagoevgrad Province. The administrative center is the town of Belitsa and there are also 11 villages and the ski resort Semkovo.

== Geography ==
Belitsa municipality is situated in a mountainous area, including parts of the Rila and Rhodope Mountains and the valley of the upper flow of the Mesta river. Belitsa is situated on the southern foothills of Rila, while Semkovo is much higher and is actually the highest part of the municipality. The villages Dagonovo, Kraishte and Gorno Kraishte are in the valley of Mesta river and the rest of the villages are in the Rhodope Mountains.

The entire area of the municipality is 293,536 decares, of which 221,862 are wooded areas and 62,205 are farmlands. The terrain is mostly mountainous and hilly. The territory includes parts of Rila, the Rhodopes, and the dale of the Mesta river. East of the valley, on the river Belichka, there are parts of the eastern (Musalenski) section of the Rila Mountains.

== History ==
The region has been populated 8000 years BC. The remains from that period have been found at the archaeological site Raven near Belitsa. There are Thracian remains near Babyak and Belitsa, some of them with big importance – a wooden sarcophagus exposed in the historical museum in Belitsa and a marble plate with the images of Zeus and Hera, now in the National Historical Museum in Sofia. The name Belitsa has been noted for first time in Ottoman documents from 1576 year. In 1716 the first Christian church has been built. According to the Treaty of Berlin (1878) the region was returned to the Ottoman Empire. After the Ilinden–Preobrazhenie Uprising in 1903 the town of Belitsa was destroyed and burnt. Since 1920 after the Treaty of Neuilly-sur-Seine in 1919 Belitsa and the surrounding villages have remained in Bulgaria.
In the years of the Second World War the Partisan movement engaged people from Belitsa and the near villages, who formed detachment that merged with the bigger detachment Nikola Parapunov. During the Communist government there has been several acts of renaming the people with non-Bulgarian (Islamic) names, that caused discontent in the pomak people.

== Settlements ==
Town/Village	Area (km²)	Population
Belitsa (Белица)	72.923	3 278
Babyak (Бабяк)	16.662	781
Chereshovo (Черешово)	9.335	270
Dagonovo (Дагоново)	15.802	724
Gorno Kraishte (Горно Краище)	6.159	1,167
Galabovo (Гълъбово)	4.471	80
Kraishte (Краище)	10.523	2,375
Kuzyovo (Кузьово)	14.548	272
Lyutovo (Лютово)	5.477	242
Ortsevo (Орцево)	15.146	213
Palatik (Палатик)	22.313	251
Zlataritsa (Златарица)	34.021	133
Total	227.38	9,786

== Population ==
Most of the people live in the town of Belitsa and in the villages near Mesta river. The mountainous villages are less populated (see the table above). After the last count in 2011 a slight positive growth is noticed.

	Population	Live births	Deaths	Natural growth	Birth rate (‰)	Death rate (‰)	Natural growth rate (‰)
2000	9,748	115	91	24	11.8	9.3	+2.5
2001	9,604	113	98	15	11.8	10.2	+1.6
2002	9,558	129	95	34	13.5	9.9	+3.6
2003	9,539	121	84	37	12.7	8.8	+3.9
2004	9,543	123	104	19	12.9	10.9	+2.0
2005	9,518	120	93	27	12.6	9.8	+2.8
2006	9,487	148	105	43	15.6	11.1	+4.5
2007	9,488	132	102	30	13.9	10.8	+3.2
2008	9,497	139	114	25	14.6	12.0	+2.6
2009	9,541	165	89	76	17.3	9.3	+8.0
2010	9,493	121	112	9	12.7	11.8	+0.9
2011	9,911	128	98	30	12.9	9.9	+3.0
2012	9,834	94	125	-31	9.6	12.7	-3.2
2013	9,762	85	105	-20	8.7	10.8	-2.0
2014	9,706	109	114	-5	11.2	11.7	-0.5
2015	9,617	115	131	-16	12.0	13.6	-1.7
2016	9,541	87	95	-8	9.1	10.0	-0.8
2017	9,426	91	128	-37	9.7	13.6	-3.9
2018	9,316	81	107	-26	8.7	11.5	-2.8

== Religion ==
The vast majority of the population, especially in the villages are Muslim. There are Christians in Belitsa. The first church in Belitsa, dedicated to St Demetrius of Thessaloniki was built in 1716. The second church, dedicated to St George was built in 1833–1835 with a clock-tower. In the village of Babyak, there is an old mosque from the 17th century. Mosques are built recently in Belitsa and in other villages.

According to the latest Bulgarian census of 2011, the religious composition, among those who answered the optional question on religious identification, was the following:

Religious composition of Belitsa Municipality
Orthodox Christianity	22.0%
Islam	74.7%
Protestantism	0.3%
Catholicism	0.2%
No religion	0.6%
Prefer not to answer, others and indefinable	2.2%

== Administration and institutions ==
The seat of the municipality is the town of Belitsa. The mayor of the municipality acts as mayor of the seat. There are also elected mayors in the villages: Babyak, Dagonovo, Kraishte and Gorno Kraishte. The other smaller villages have suffragan mayors, appointed from the Municipal Council. Semkovo is not an autonomous township and has no mayor. There is a police station and a post in Belitsa.

== Health ==
In the town of Belitsa work several GP physicians and dentists. The Emergency health care is provided from Razlog.

== Education and culture ==
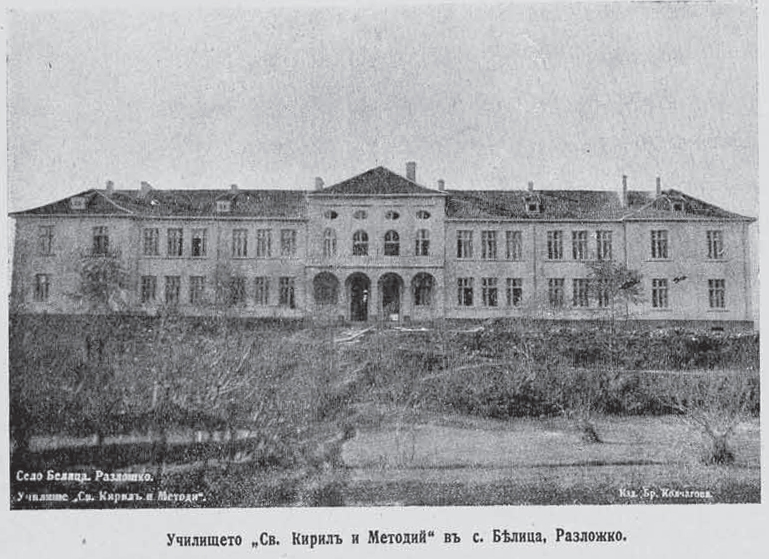
Stt Cyril and Methodius High school in Belitsa 1900–1920

- High schools in Belitsa:
  - Stt Cyril and Methodius ( I-XII grade);
  - Rehabilitation high school Nikola Vaptsarov for children with respiratory and lung problems;
- Primary schools (I-VIII grade):
  - Stt Cyril and Methodius (Babyak);
  - St Paisius of Hilendar (Kraishte);
  - Peyo Yavorov (Gorno Kraishte);
- Elementary school Petko Rachov Slaveykov (Dagonovo)
- 12 kindergartens
- Cultural centers with libraries in Belitsa and the major villages: Babyak, Dagonovo, Gorno Kraishte and Kraishte;
- Historical museum;
- Children's dancing troupe "Rila Pearls" in Belitsa.

== Economy ==
The forestry and wood processing is the most developed branch of the industry in the municipality – there are more than forty industrial subjects, situated in Belitsa and the villages near the main road. From the wood they produce paper, furniture and construction elements. Clothing and food industry are also important for the region. Harvesting are gardening are present only in the valley and sheep and goat farming in the mountains. There is a bank for currency exchange.

== Transportation ==
There is only one national secondary road from Velingrad to Razlog, connecting the central part of Bulgaria with southwestern part of the country, that passes through the municipality. Municipal roads connect the villages. The roads need improvement and transportation is difficult, especially in the winter. Regular bus lines run to Sofia, Plovdiv, Blagoevgrad, Velingrad, Razlog, Bansko and Yakoruda daily. There are no municipal lines organized.

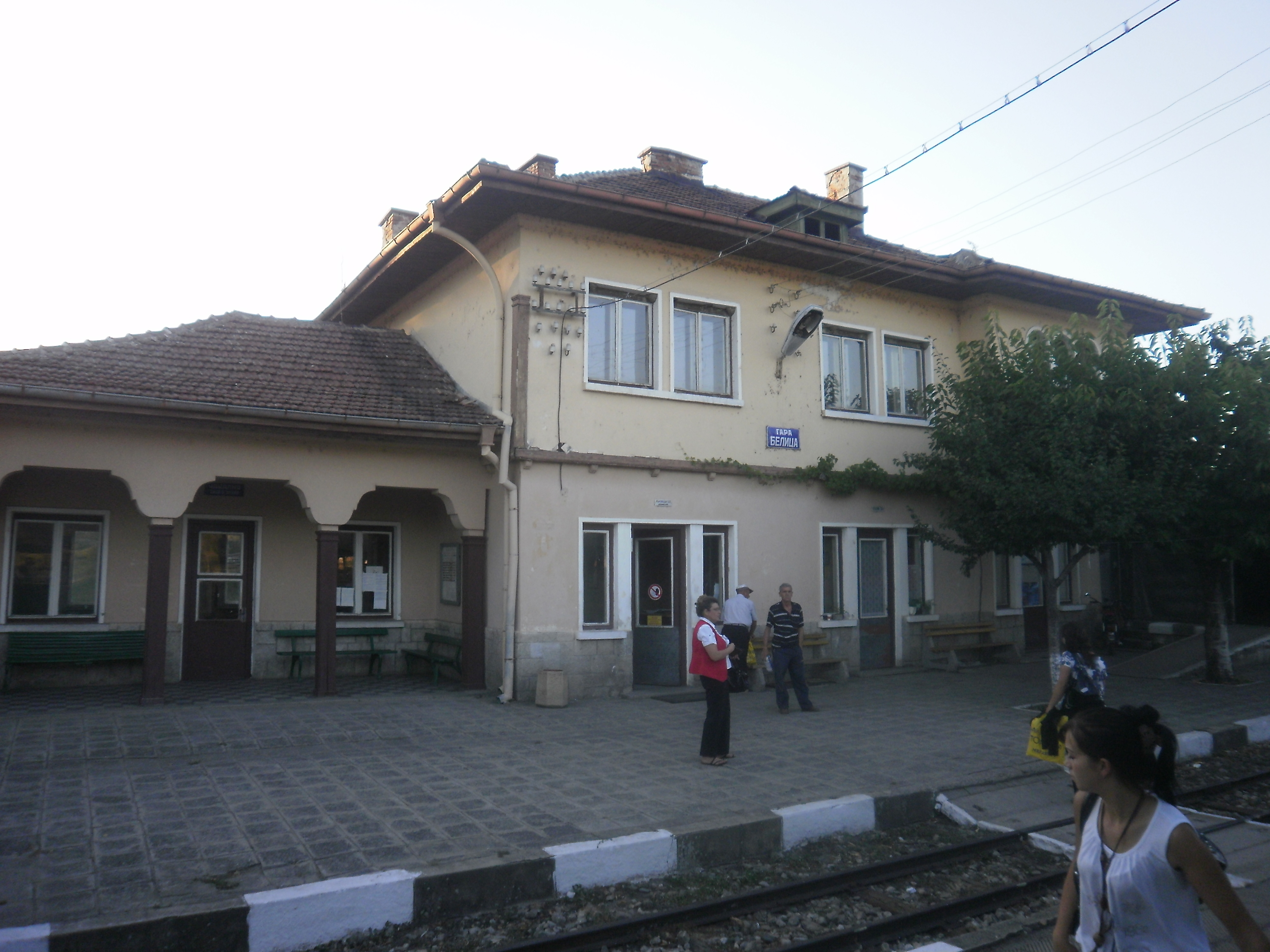
Belitsa train station

Septemvri-Dobrinishte narrow gauge line, running along Mesta river is having stops in Dagonovo and Belitsa station. The station is 4 km south from the town in the village of Kraishte. There is no water transport or air transport in the municipality. The ports of Thessaloniki and Kavala and the international airports of Sofia, Plovdiv, Thessaloniki and Kavala are the nearest sea and airports.

== Infrastructure and communications ==
Central water supply exists only in Belitsa, Kraishte and Gorno Kraishte and in the ski resort Semkovo. The other smaller villages use local water sources. Sewerage works in Belitsa and Dagonovo and in Semkovo. Electrical power supply is well organized and all the inhabited places have electricity. Phone lines are not available in the remote villages and there exist radio connected phones. Mobile connections are limited because of the terrain, but generally available in all villages. Internet via cable is accessible only in Belitsa.

== Nature ==
The Rila and Rhodope Mountains are forming the natural characteristics of the municipality. There are many natural phenomenons and interesting places near Belitsa, Babyak and Semkovo. There is a park for "dancing bears", where live bears, collected from people in Bulgaria and near countries.

== Tourism ==
There are no hotels in Belitsa, but only in Semkovo. Restaurants with traditional and European cuisine are available in Belitsa and Semkovo. The picturesque nature offers a lot of places for sightseeing and picnic.

== See also ==
- Rila
- Rhodope Mountains
- Chech
