= Cluttering (disambiguation) =

Cluttering may refer to the following:

- Cluttering, the speech disorder characterized by a speech rate that is perceived to be abnormally rapid, irregular, or both for the speaker.
- Cluttered speech, which is disorganized, hurried speech, which sounds like the speech of someone with the disorder but occurs in people without speech problems
- Stuttering, a speech disorder that sounds like cluttering, and a common word for cluttered speech.
- Cluttering (organization), which means filling your personal space with tat or clutter.
