= Kulinoto =

Ski resort in Bulgaria

Coordinates: 41°51′57″N 23°20′42″E

Kulinoto is a ski resort in the northern Pirin Mountains of Bulgaria. Located at 1400 metres above sea level, it is located 12 kilometres from the town of Razlog and 20 kilometers from the ski resort Bansko.
