= Zlataritsa, Blagoevgrad Province =

Zlataritsa Златарица
- Village
- Location within Bulgaria
- Coordinates: 41°55′20″N 23°45′35″E
- Country: Bulgaria
- Province: Blagoevgrad Province
- Municipality: Belitsa

Government
  - Suffragan mayor: Ibrahim Palev

Area
  - Total: 34,021 km^{2} (13,136 sq mi)
- Elevation: 1,347 m (4,419 ft)

Population (2010)
  - Total: 133
- GRAO
- Time zone: UTC+2 (EET)
  - Summer (DST): UTC+3 (EEST)
- Postal Code: 2783
- Area code: 06153

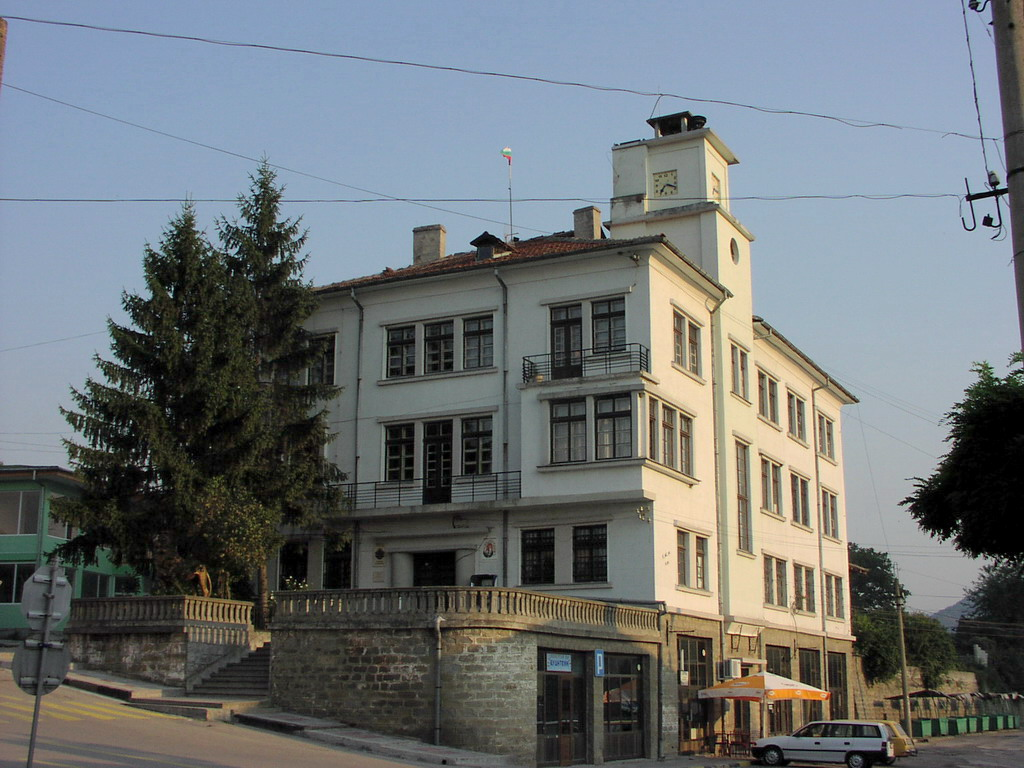
Zlataritsa City Hall in 2006

Zlataritsa (Bulgarian: Златарица) is a very remote village in Belitsa Municipality, in Blagoevgrad Province, Bulgaria. It is located approximately 33 kilometers east from Belitsa and 93 kilometers southeast from Sofia highly in the Rhodope Mountains. As of 2010 it had a population of 133 people. The population is Muslim of pomak origin. There is a reservoir in the area.
