= Chereshovo, Blagoevgrad Province =

Chereshovo Черешово
- Village
- Location within Bulgaria
- Coordinates: 41°56′56″N 23°42′30″E
- Country: Bulgaria
- Province: Blagoevgrad Province
- Municipality: Belitsa

Government
  - Suffragan Mayor: Alish Kunyov

Area
  - Total: 9,335 km^{2} (3,604 sq mi)
- Elevation: 1,319 m (4,327 ft)

Population (15-12-2010)
  - Total: 270
- Time zone: UTC+2 (EET)
  - Summer (DST): UTC+3 (EEST)
- Postal Code: 2787
- Area code: 074404

Chereshovo (Bulgarian: Черешово) is a village in the municipality of Belitsa, in Blagoevgrad Province, Bulgaria. It is located approximately 27 km west of Belitsa and 88 kilometers southeast of Sofia. A fourth class municipal road connects the village with the secondary national road Razlog - Velingrad via the villages of Kraishte, Lyutovo, and Babyak. As of 2010, it had a population of 270 people all of them Muslim of Pomak origin. Aerial electrical supply and drinking water from local sources are provided. The village has no elected mayor, having fewer than 350 inhabitants, and a suffragan mayor, appointed from the municipal council is in charge.
