= Palatik =

Palatik Палатик
- Village
- Location within Bulgaria
- Coordinates: 41°54′36″N 23°40′19″E
- Country: Bulgaria
- Province: Blagoevgrad Province
- Municipality: Belitsa

Government
  - Suffragan mayor: Ibrahim Palev

Population (2007)
  - Total: 286
- Time zone: UTC+2 (EET)
  - Summer (DST): UTC+3 (EEST)

Palatik or Palatnik (Bulgarian: Палатик) is a village in the municipality of Belitsa, in Blagoevgrad Province, Bulgaria. It is located approximately 86 kilometres from Sofia. As of 2007 it had a population of 286 people.
