= Kuzyovo =

Kuzyovo Кузьово
- Village
- Location within Bulgaria
- Coordinates: 41°54′0″N 23°38′47″E
- Country: Bulgaria
- Province: Blagoevgrad Province
- Municipality: Belitsa

Government
  - Suffragan Mayor: Ismail Atip

Area
  - Total: 14,548 km^{2} (5,617 sq mi)
- Elevation: 1,336 m (4,383 ft)

Population (15 December 2010)
  - Total: 272
- GRAO
- Time zone: UTC+2 (EET)
  - Summer (DST): UTC+3 (EEST)
- Postal Code: 2788
- Area code: 074404

Kuzyovo (Bulgarian: Кузьово) is a village in the municipality of Belitsa, in Blagoevgrad Province, Bulgaria. It is located approximately 22 kilometers southeast from Belitsa and 85-90 kilometers southeast from Sofia. As of 2010 it had a population of 272 people. The population is Muslim of pomak origin. A fourth class municipal road connects the village with Belitsa.
