= George Andreytchine =

Bulgarian political activist (1894–1950)

- Георги Андрейчин
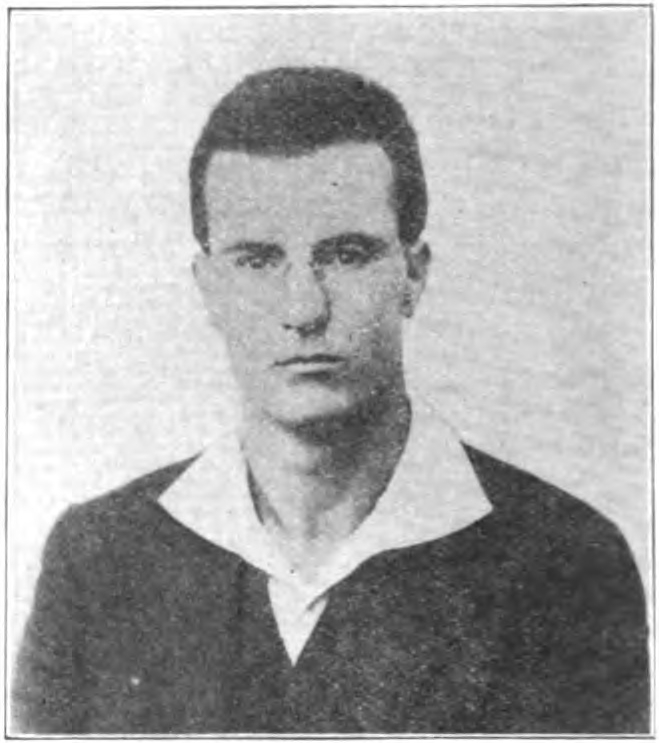
- Andreytchine c. 1916
- Born: January 19, 1894; Belitsa
- Died: April 20, 1950 (aged 56); Moscow
- Occupations: Journalist, trade union organizer, diplomat
- Years active: 1916–1950

George Iliev Andreytchine (Bulgarian: Георги Андрейчин, Russian: Георгий Илькович Андрейчин, romanized: Georgiy Ilkovich Andreychin; January 19, 1894, Belitsa – April 20, 1950, Moscow) was a Bulgarian political activist active in Bulgaria, the United States and the Soviet Union.

== Biography ==
=== Early years ===
After emigrating to the US in 1913 at the age of 19, George Andreytchine played a prominent part in the Industrial Workers of the World (IWW). He was editor of the IWW's Bulgarian newspaper published in Chicago, Rabotnicheska Misul [Workers' Thought] and gained notoriety in the 1916 Mesabi Range iron strike in Minnesota.

After American entry into the war, severe repression of IWW leaders and publications follow, leading to Andreychine's arrest in 1918 for “anti-war propaganda” under the Espionage Act of 1917. He was convicted as part of the mass trial of 166 "wobblies" in the fall of 1918 and sentenced to 20 years in prison, with a fine of $20,000.

Andreytchine served time at Leavenworth Federal Penitentiary from September 1918 until June 1919, at which time he gained his release on bail pending appeal. He was a member of the paid editorial staff of IWW weekly New Solidarity in 1920, in which capacity he was a leading proponent of affiliation of the IWW to the Communist International.

=== Soviet Russia ===
He jumped bail with his case pending appeal in April 1921, sailing to Soviet Russia, where he became a founding member of the Red International of Labour Unions (RILU) in July, elected as a member of RILU's 5-person Bureau. He was tapped as and American Representative to RILU in 1922 and served as one of three members of RILU's Eastern Bureau from Feb. 1922.

He joined the Communist Party of the Soviet Union, wherein he was aligned with Leon Trotsky.

Andreytchine lost favor end 1923 due to his support of Leon Trotsky and retained no important positions in either the Comintern or the Profintern (RILU) after 1924. He instead worked at various tasks in Gosplan and the Supreme Council of National Economy (Vesenkha). He also served as a representative in London of the People's Commissariat of Foreign Affairs.

Andreytchine was active in organizing the Left Opposition, leading to his arest in Moscow in late 1927, although subsequently released.

In 1935 he was arrested and charged with Trotskyism and espionage and sentenced for 10 years of Gulag labor camps. He served in Ukhtpechlag and Vorkutlag, among other places. He was released in 1941.

During the war he worked in Soviet Information Bureau.

=== Return to Bulgaria ===
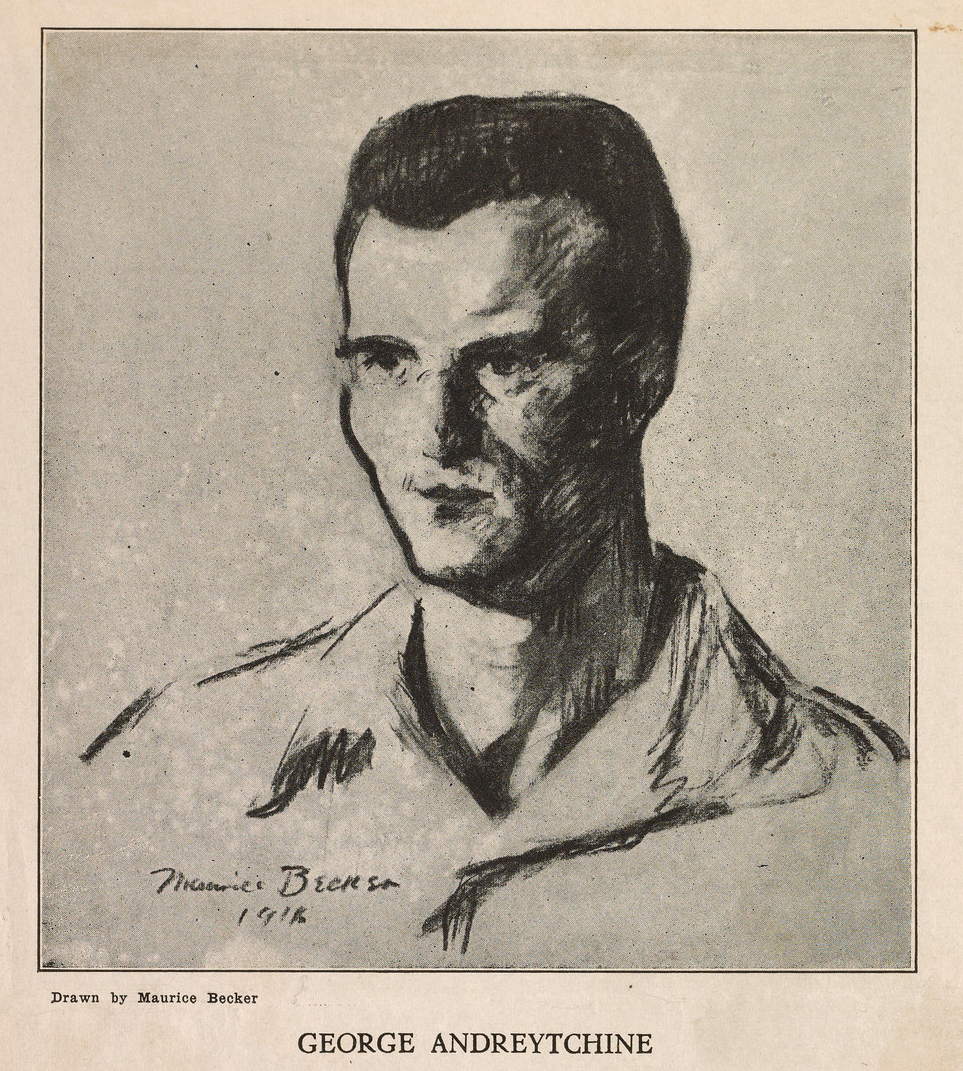
Portrait by Maurice Becker, 1916.

Former Christian Science Monitor correspondent William Henry Chamberlin, who knew Andreytchine well during his 1922 to 1934 stint in Moscow, bumped into Andreytchine at a Paris cafe in 1946 where he was sitting with his wife:

"It was like seeing a ghost. Our last word was that he was in a Soviet concentration camp. [As he was with other unknown men] we decided to leave to him the question of recognizing us. As soon as he saw us he came over with the familiar warm greetings and in this and other meetings we learned that he had been released from the concentration camp, employed in translations during the war, and finally permitted to return to his native Bulgaria. The men in the restaurant with him were members of the Bulgarian peace delegation.

"His story did not have a happy ending. About a year later there was a brief notice in The Economist of a purge in the public service of Bulgaria. Among its victims was 'the head of the Anglo-American Department of the Foreign Ministry, Andreytchine.' George Andreytchine had exhausted his nine lives of a cat. If he had only made a break for freedom while he was still in Paris he could have written one of the most brilliant and informed books about the Soviet Union. But his family had been detained in Bulgaria; a jail sentence was hanging over him in the United States. He took his chance, went back, and lost."

He was remembered by Chamberlin as "self-educated but well-educated, fluent in several languages, and with an infectious warmth of personality."
