= Gorno Kraishte =

Gorno Kraishte Горно Краище
- Village
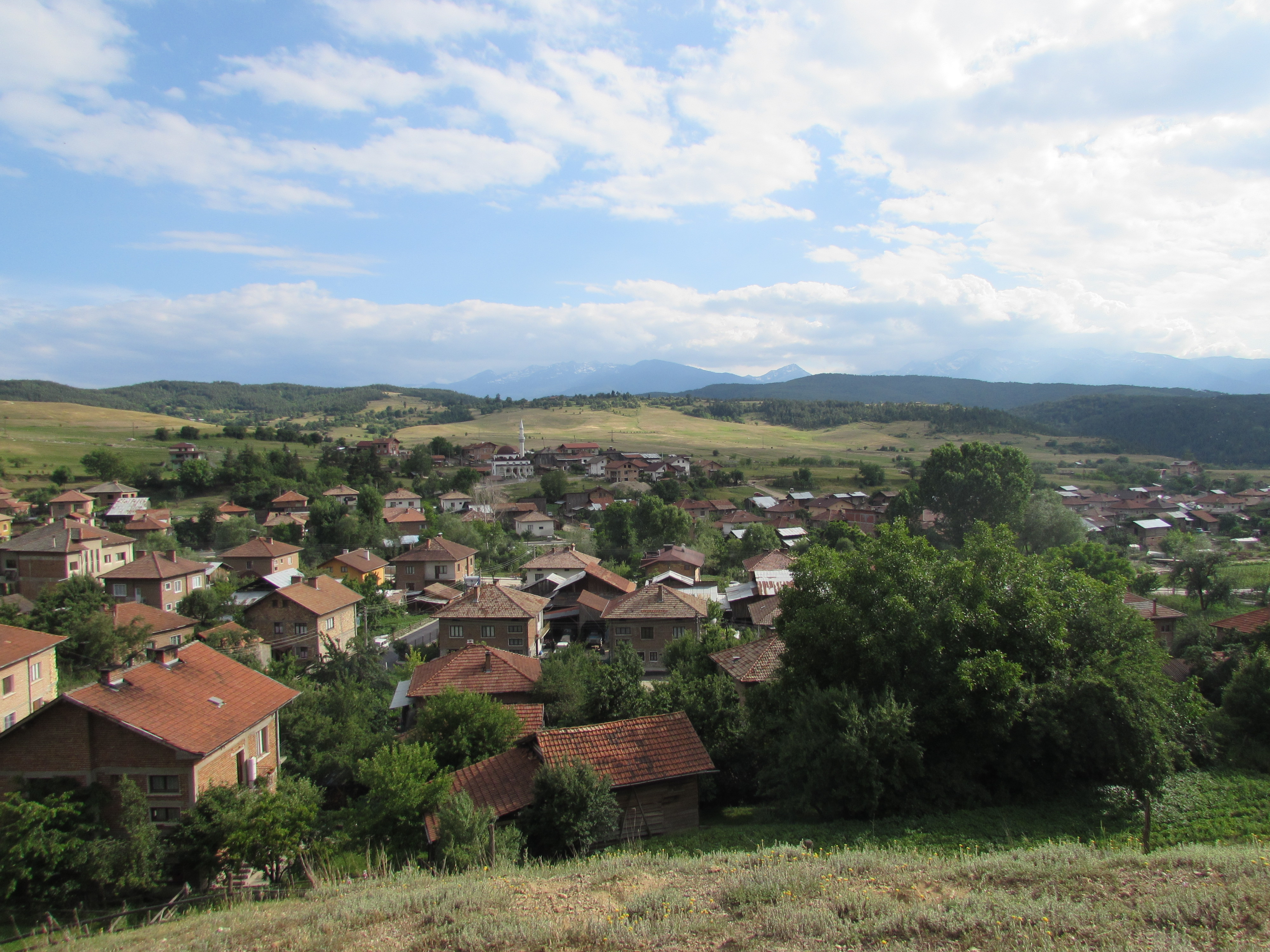

- Location within Bulgaria
- Coordinates: 41°53′58″N 23°35′32″E
- Country: Bulgaria
- Province: Blagoevgrad Province
- Municipality: Belitsa

Government
  - Mayor: Bekir Bekir (DPS)

Area
  - Total: 6,159 km^{2} (2,378 sq mi)
- Elevation: 846 m (2,776 ft)

Population (15-12-2010)
  - Total: 1,167
- GRAO
- Time zone: UTC+2 (EET)
  - Summer (DST): UTC+3 (EEST)
- Postal Code: 2783
- Area code: 074405

Gorno Kraishte (Bulgarian: Горно Краище) is a village in the municipality of Belitsa, in Blagoevgrad Province, Bulgaria. It is located approximately 6 kilometers south of Belitsa and 90 kilometers southeast from Sofia. As of 2010 it had a population of 1176 people. The population is Muslim of pomak origin.

== Geography and climate ==
The terrain is mountainous and hilly, covering parts of Western Rila and Rhodope Mountains and the valley in the upper reaches of the Mesta River. The average altitude is 850 meters. The climate is transitional continental with an average annual temperature is 8 °C. Winters are cold, with an average January temperature of just -2 °C. The snow cover lasts about 150 days a year, with increasing altitude and increasing the number of days with snow cover. Summer is short and cool with average temperatures in July around 18 °C. The three majestic mountains, among which it is located - Rila, Pirin and the Rhodope have a unique history and folklore. Gorno Kraishte has two road links, to Razlog and Belovo and a narrow gauge railway link - Belitsa station. The village has a primary school "Peyo Yavorov" and a post office. Electricity is provided by aerial wires. There is a central water supply.
