= Delayed auditory feedback =

Extension of the time between speech and auditory perception

Delayed auditory feedback (DAF), also called delayed sidetone, is a type of altered auditory feedback that consists of extending the time between speech and auditory perception. It can consist of a device that enables a user to speak into a microphone and then hear their voice in headphones a fraction of a second later. Some DAF devices are hardware; DAF computer software is also available. Most delays that produce a noticeable effect are between 50–200 milliseconds (ms). DAF usage (with a 175 ms delay) has been shown to induce mental stress.

It is a type of altered auditory feedback that—along with frequency-altered feedback and white noise masking—is used to treat stuttering; it has also demonstrated interesting discoveries about the auditory feedback system when used with non-stuttering individuals. It is most effective when used in both ears. Delayed auditory feedback devices are used in speech perception experiments in order to demonstrate the importance of auditory feedback in speech perception as well as in speech production.

There are now also different mobile apps available that use DAF in phone calls.

== Effects in people who stutter ==
Electronic fluency devices use delayed auditory feedback and have been used as a technique to aid with stuttering. Stuttering is a speech disorder that interferes with the fluent production of speech. Some of the symptoms that characterize stuttering disfluencies are repetitions, prolongations and blocks. Early investigators suggested and have continually been proven correct in assuming that those who stutter had an abnormal speech–auditory feedback loop that was corrected or bypassed while speaking under DAF. More specifically, neuroimaging studies of people with stuttering have revealed abnormalities in several fronto-paretotemporal pathways and are thought to affect connectivity between speech (pre)motor regions and auditory regions. The above is consistent with behavioral studies that demonstrate that stutterers present reduced compensatory motor responses to unexpected perturbations of auditory feedback.

The mechanism of action of DAF is to reduce the speed of speech in such a way that the longer the delay time, the greater the reduction is made. It has been proposed that it is in fact the reduction in speaking rate that produces fluency when using DAF however, it has been evidenced in other studies that a slow speaking rate is not a prerequisite for improving fluency under DAF. Furthermore, DAF is believed to continue to cause increased fluency over a long period of time, but reports of long-term effects are inconsistent. This is because in some cases a continued but small benefit was obtained, while in others little benefit was found from the beginning and they did not continue using DAF. Clinical observations have determined that DAF may be less effective in people whose fluency failures are mostly blocks as opposed to people who present mostly repetitions and prolongations. In people who stutter with atypical auditory anatomy, DAF improves fluency, but not in those with typical anatomy. DAF is also used with people who clutter. Its effects are slowing of speech which can result in increased fluency for people who clutter and also syllable awareness.

== Effects in people who do not stutter ==
Studies that are more recent have looked at the effects of DAF in people who do not stutter to see what it can prove about the structure of the auditory and verbal pathways in the brain.

Indirect effects of delayed auditory feedback in people who do not stutter include a reduction in the rate of speech, an increase in intensity, and an increase in fundamental frequency that occur to overcome the effects of the feedback. Direct effects include the repetition of syllables, mispronunciations, omissions, and omitted word endings. These direct effects are often referred to as "artificial stuttering". Delayed auditory feedback can be constructed using a speaker pointed at the person speaking, yielding a "speechjammer".

With an individual who does not stutter, auditory feedback speech sounds are directed to the inner ear with a 0.001 second delay. In delayed auditory feedback, the delay is artificially disrupted.

Studies have found that in children ages 4–6 there is less disturbance of speech than in children ages 7–9 under a delay of 200 ms. Younger children are maximally disrupted around 500 ms while older children around 400 ms. A 200 ms delay produces maximum disruption for adults. As the data collected from these studies indicate, the delay required for maximum disruption decreases with age. However, it increases again for older adults, to 400 ms.

Sex differences in DAF show no difference or indicate that men are generally more affected than women, indicating that the feedback subsystems in the vocal monitor process could be different between the sexes.

In general, more rapid, fluent speakers are less affected by DAF than slower, less fluent speakers. Also, more rapid fluent speakers are maximally disrupted by a shorter delay time, while slower speakers are maximally disrupted under longer delay times.

Studies using computational modeling and functional magnetic resonance imaging (fMRI) have shown that the temporo-parietal regions function as a conscious self-monitoring system to support an automatic speech production system and that projections from auditory error cells in the posterior superior temporal cortex that go to motor correction cells in right frontal cortex mediate auditory feedback control of speech.

== Effects in non-humans ==
Juvenile songbirds learn to sing through sensory learning. They memorize songs and then engage in sensorimotor learning through vocal practice. Songs produced during sensorimotor learning are more variable and dependent on auditory feedback unlike adult songs. Adult zebra finches and Bengal finches, for example, need feedback to keep their songs stable, and deafening in these species leads to song impairment.

Continuous delayed auditory feedback in zebra finch songbirds caused them to change their song syllable timing, indicating that DAF can change the motor program of syllable timing generation during short periods of time in zebra finches, similar to the effects observed in humans. Moreover, in experiments, DAF is used to selectively interrupt auditory feedback in such a way that when adult zebra finches are exposed, their songs degrade and when discontinued they recover. As DAF is reversible and precise it can be applied and directed to specific syllables within a song as only the target syllable is degraded while the flanking syllables are not affected. Furthermore, contingent DAF, applied based on pitch thresholds, triggers adaptive changes in pitch and minimizes feedback interference in adult finches.
