= Ortsevo =

Ortsevo Орцево
- Village
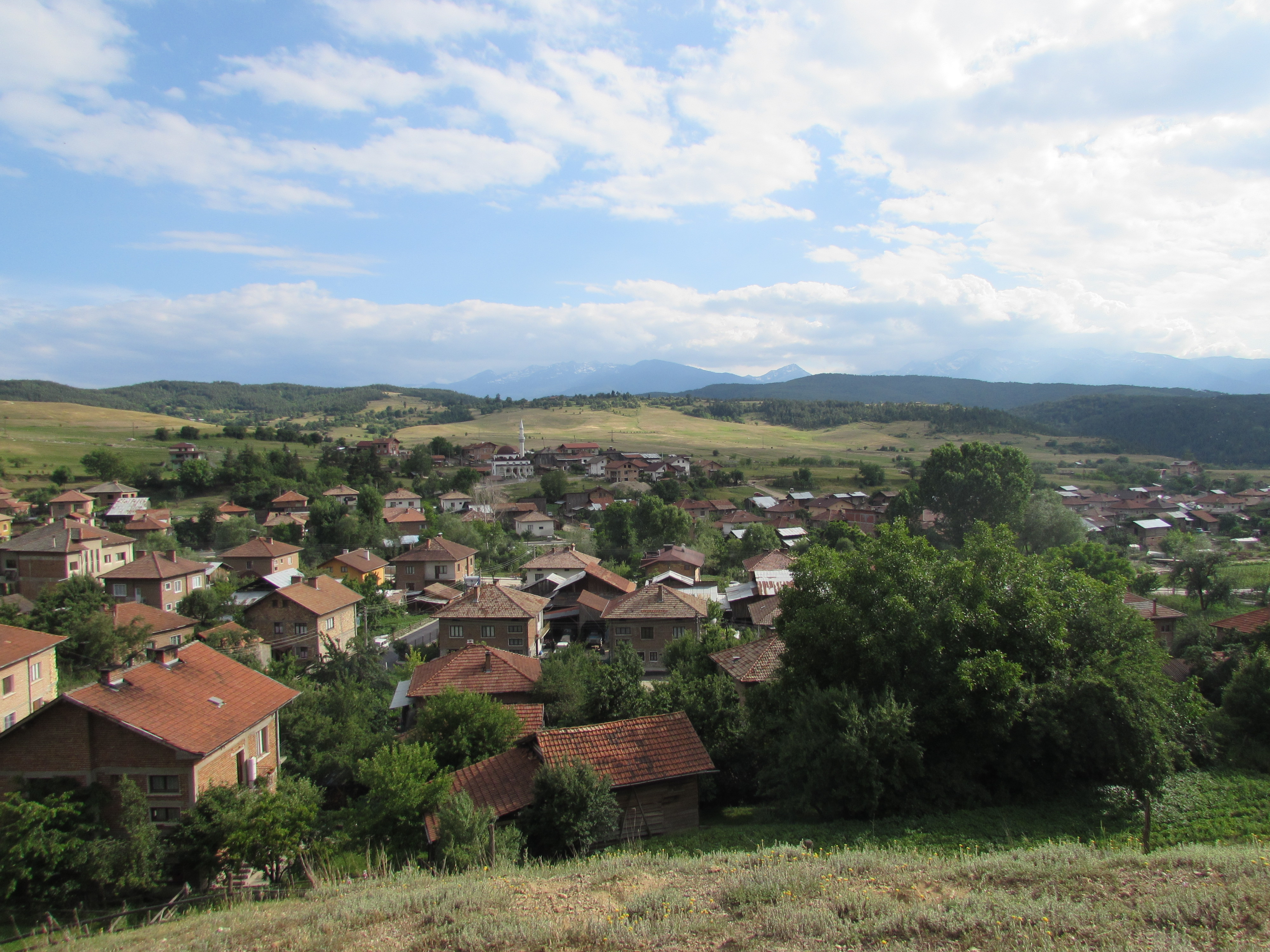

- Location within Bulgaria
- Coordinates: 41°57′41″N 23°43′51″E
- Country: Bulgaria
- Province: Blagoevgrad Province
- Municipality: Belitsa

Government
  - Suffragan Mayor: Ibrahim Palev

Area
  - Total: 15,146 km^{2} (5,848 sq mi)
- Elevation: 1,555 m (5,102 ft)

Population (15 December 2010)
  - Total: 213
- GRAO
- Time zone: UTC+2 (EET)
  - Summer (DST): UTC+3 (EEST)
- Postal Code: 2785
- Area code: 074404

Ortsevo (Bulgarian: Орцево) is a remote village in the municipality of Belitsa, in Blagoevgrad Province, Bulgaria. It is located in the western Rhodope Mountains, approximately 23 kilometers east of Belitsa and 87 kilometers southeast of Sofia. As of 2010 it had a population of 213 people. The population is Muslim of Bulgarian origin.

Ortsevo's village square is situated at ca. 1,550 m above sea level and some of the houses lie at ca. 1,640 m. This makes it the highest permanently inhabited village in Bulgaria and all of the Balkans (the slightly higher village of Chamla lies at ca. 1,650 m, but has been abandoned since the 1980s).
