= Cluttering =

Speech and communication disorder

- Other names: Tachyphemia, tachyphrasia
- Specialty: Pediatrics, Psychiatry

Cluttering is a speech and communication disorder characterized by a rapid rate of speech, erratic rhythm, and poor syntax or grammar, making speech difficult to understand.

== Classification ==
Cluttering is a speech and communication disorder that has also been described as a fluency disorder.

It is defined as:

Cluttering is a fluency disorder characterized by a rate that is perceived to be abnormally rapid, irregular, or both for the speaker (although measured syllable rates may not exceed normal limits). These rate abnormalities further are manifest in one or more of the following symptoms: (a) an excessive number of disfluencies, the majority of which are not typical of people with stuttering; (b) the frequent placement of pauses and use of prosodic patterns that do not conform to syntactic and semantic constraints; and (c) inappropriate (usually excessive) degrees of coarticulation among sounds, especially in multisyllabic words.

== Signs and symptoms ==
Cluttering is sometimes confused with stuttering. Both communication disorders break the normal flow of speech, but they are distinct. A stutterer has a coherent pattern of thoughts, but may have a difficult time vocally expressing those thoughts; in contrast, a clutterer has no problem putting thoughts into words, but those thoughts become disorganized during speaking. Cluttering affects not only speech, but also thought patterns, writing, typing, and conversation.

Stutterers are usually dysfluent on initial sounds, when beginning to speak, and become more fluent towards the ends of utterances. In contrast, clutterers are most clear at the start of utterances, but their speaking rate increases and intelligibility decreases towards the end of utterances.

Stuttering is characterized by struggle behavior, such as overtense speech production muscles. Cluttering, in contrast, is effortless. Cluttering is also characterized by slurred speech, especially dropped or distorted /r/ and /l/ sounds; and monotone speech that starts loud and trails off into a murmur.

A clutterer described the feeling associated with a clutter as:

It feels like 1) about twenty thoughts explode on my mind all at once, and I need to express them all, 2) that when I'm trying to make a point, that I just remembered something that I was supposed to say, so the person can understand, and I need to interrupt myself to say something that I should have said before, and 3) that I need to constantly revise the sentences that I'm working on, to get it out right.

== Differential diagnosis ==
Cluttering can often be confused with various language disorders, learning disabilities, and attention deficit hyperactivity disorder (ADHD). Clutterers often have reading and writing disabilities, especially sprawling, disorderly handwriting, which poorly integrate ideas and space. It can occur with Parkinson's disease.

== Causes ==
To date, there are no genetic studies of cluttering; however, there are reasons to assume a substantial genetic influence—many cases of cluttering have relatives with cluttering or stuttering, or a general tendency towards high speech rate.

The research on the neurology of cluttering is very limited, but there is support for a theoretical model proposed by Alm (2011): In short, cluttering is viewed as a condition related to the automatic regulation of speech rate, which to a large extent is based on the functions of the basal ganglia in the deep interior of the brain. The basal ganglia interact with cortical areas, in particular areas located at the medial walls of the brain hemispheres, such as the supplementary motor area (SMA) and the anterior cingulate cortex. In cases where spurts of speech are intermingled with more normal speech, this variation may be explained by an ability of the cerebral cortex to control the speech movements, but only as long as conscious attention is directed toward the speech. However, when the speaker begins to rely on automaticity, related to the basal ganglia, the speech rate tends to become high and uncontrolled. This model may also explain associated symptoms such as attentional problems, hyperactivity, and interrupted and revised sentences, among others. This is because the circuits involving the basal ganglia and the frontal cerebral cortex are also central to attention, inhibitory control, working memory, and cognition. This theoretical model gained empirical support from a study using functional magnetic resonance imaging (fMRI).

== Treatment ==
The common goals of treatment for cluttering include slowing the rate of speech, heightening monitoring, using clear articulation, using acceptable and organized language, interacting with listeners, speaking naturally, and reducing excessive disfluencies.

Slowing the rate of speech can help many of the symptoms of cluttering, and can be achieved in a couple of different ways. It is important that speech language pathologists do not nag their clients to "slow down" incessantly, as this does not help and can actually hinder progress. Additionally, it is important to remember that speech rate often increases when emotional arousal or stress increases. Instead of constant verbal reminders, clinicians may use a combination of delayed auditory feedback (DAF), giving out "speeding tickets" (written reminders to slow down speech), or recording speech and having clients transcribe it, writing in where there is need for spaces and pauses.

Many people who clutter are either unable or unwilling to think about their speech, particularly in casual speech. The strategies to slow speech down all require careful monitoring of speech, which can be very difficult for those who clutter. Imagination and careful observation are used to increase monitoring. For instance, an adult who clutters may be asked to visualize themselves speaking slowly and clearly before they actually speak. Additionally, video and audio recordings may be used to show those who clutter where communication starts to break down in their speech.

In general, slowing the rate of speech and/or monitoring speech more effectively should lead to clearer articulation. However, if they do not, additional treatment is needed. These articulation treatment strategies include practicing short sentences with "over-articulated", unnatural but technically correct, speech. Reading multisyllabic words and focusing on including each of the sounds is another strategy to enhance articulation.

Some individuals who clutter will need help learning to tell stories logically and sequentially. This can be aided by learning how to begin narratives with simple, short sentences, and slowly building to longer, more complex ones. Additionally, clinicians may transcribe cluttered speech to clients to show them run-ons and ramblings, and then ask them to just state the necessary, most important information in the utterance.

Additional strategies that may help people who clutter include checking in, ensuring that they have understood any non-verbal or turn-taking cues in the conversation, imitating clinician models of speech to improve natural speech, and treating any stuttering that may be co-occurring with cluttering. The two are separate disorders, but many people who clutter also stutter.

== History ==
Battaros was a legendary Libyan king who spoke quickly and in a disorderly fashion. Others who spoke as he did were said to have battarismus. This is the earliest record of the speech disorder of cluttering.

In the 1960s, cluttering was called tachyphemia, a word derived from the Greek for 'fast speech'. This word is no longer used to describe cluttering because fast speech is not a required element of cluttering.

Deso Weiss described cluttering as the outward manifestation of a "central language imbalance".

The First World Conference on Cluttering was held in May 2007 in Razlog, Bulgaria. It had over 60 participants from North America, Europe, the Middle East and Asia.

== Society and culture ==
Weiss claimed that Battaros, Demosthenes, Pericles, Justinian, Otto von Bismarck, and Winston Churchill were clutterers. He says about these people, "Each of these contributors to world history viewed his world holistically, and was not deflected by exaggerated attention to small details. Perhaps then, they excelled because of, rather than in spite of, their [cluttering]."

== See also ==
- Voice disorders
- Developmental verbal dyspraxia

== Sources ==
- Studies in Tachyphemia, An Investigation of Cluttering and General Language Disability. Speech Rehabilitation Institute. New York, 1963.
- Myers, F. and K. St. Louis, (1992) Cluttering: A Clinical Perspective, Leicester, England: Far Communications
