= Vapski Lakes =

Glacial lakes in Bulgaria

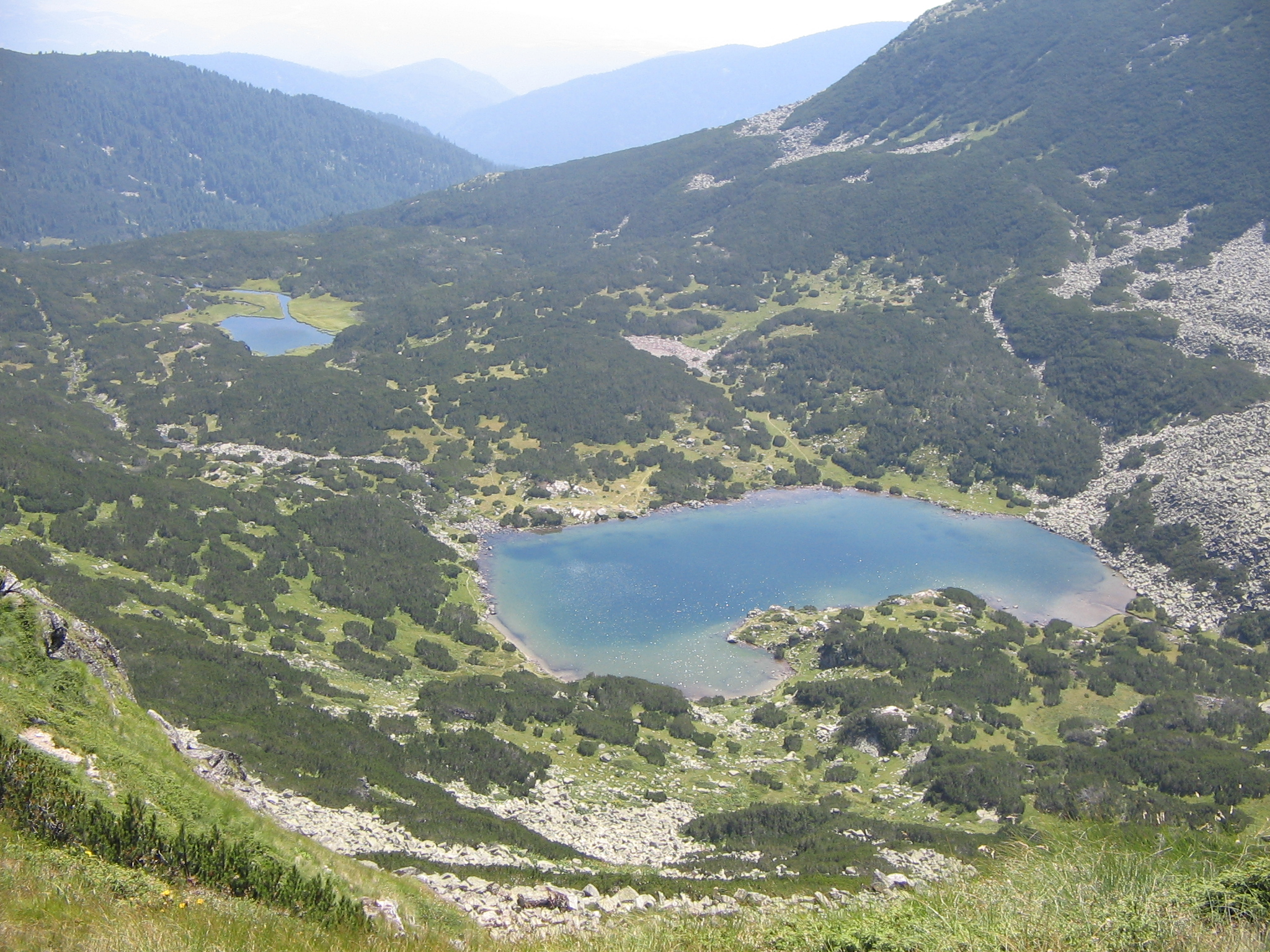

- Location within Bulgaria
- Coordinates: 42°5′3″N 23°31′1″E
- Basin countries: Bulgaria
- Surface elevation: 2,268 m (7,441 ft) to 2,234 m (7,329 ft)

Vapski Lakes (Bulgarian: Вапски езера) are a group of two glacial lakes situated in the central part of the Rila mountain range in southwestern Bulgaria. They are located north of the Semkovo resort, south of the summit of Vapa (2,528 m) and west of the summit of Sredni Vrah (2,531 m).

The upper lake is the larger one and is situated at an altitude of 2,268 m. It has an elongated kidney-like shape with an area of 26,200 m^{2}. The lower lake is almost circular in shape and is much smaller, only 2,800 m^{2}. The shores of the lakes are steep and rocky. The surrounding slopes are overgrown with dwarf mountain pine (Pinus mugo). The lakes are drained by the Vapa, one of the constituent rivers of the Belishkra reka, a right tributary of the Mesta. There are river trouts in the lakes.
