= Fluency =

Ability to deliver information quickly and correctly

Fluency (also called volubility and eloquency) refers to continuity, smoothness, rate, and effort in speech production. It is also used to characterize language production, language ability or language proficiency.

In speech language pathology fluency means the flow with which sounds, syllables, words and phrases are joined when speaking quickly, where fluency disorder has been used as a collective term for cluttering and stuttering.

== Definition ==
Fluency is a term concerning language production on the one hand, which is used in language ability or language proficiency It is also used to characterize speech production on the other hand with some overlap.

In speech language pathology it means the smoothness or flow with which sounds, syllables, words and phrases are joined when speaking quickly. It refers to "continuity, smoothness, rate, and effort in speech production". The term fluency disorder has been used as a collective term for cluttering and stuttering since at least 1993.

Fluency is the property of a person or of a system that delivers information quickly and with expertise.

== Language use ==
Language fluency is one of a variety of terms used to characterize or measure a person's language ability, often used in conjunction with accuracy and complexity. Although there are no widely agreed-upon definitions or measures of language fluency, someone is typically said to be fluent if their use of the language appears fluid, or natural, coherent, and easy as opposed to slow, halting use. In other words, fluency is often described as the ability to produce language on demand and be understood.

Varying definitions of fluency characterize it by the language user's automaticity, their speed and coherency of language use, or the length and rate of their speech output. Theories of automaticity postulate that more fluent language users can manage all of the components of language use without paying attention to each individual component of the act. In other words, fluency is achieved when one can access language knowledge and produce language unconsciously, or automatically. Theories that focus on speed or length and rate of speech typically expect fluent language users to produce language in real time without unusual pauses, false starts, or repetitions (recognizing that some presence of these elements are naturally part of speech). Fluency is sometimes considered to be a measure of performance rather than an indicator of more concrete language knowledge, and thus perception and understandability are often key ways that fluency is understood.

Language fluency is sometimes contrasted with accuracy (or correctness of language use, especially grammatical correctness) and complexity (or a more encompassing knowledge of vocabulary and discourse strategies). Fluency, accuracy, and complexity are distinct but interrelated components of language acquisition and proficiency.

=== Types ===
There are four commonly discussed types of fluency: reading fluency, oral fluency, oral-reading fluency, and written or compositional fluency. These types of fluency are interrelated, but do not necessarily develop in tandem or linearly. One may develop fluency in certain type(s) and be less fluent or nonfluent in others.

In the sense of proficiency, "fluency" encompasses a number of related but separable skills:

- Reading fluency refers to the link between the recognition of words while reading and reading comprehension, which manifests itself in the speed and accuracy that one is able to read text. Research on reading fluency aligns concepts of accuracy, automaticity, and prosody. To achieve reading fluency, readers must have knowledge of the content of the language as well as the vocabulary being used. Interventions designed to help children learn to read fluently generally include some form of repeated reading, but this process may differ for children with learning disabilities, who may struggle with reading fluency.
- Oral fluency or speaking fluency is a measurement both of production and reception of speech, as a fluent speaker must be able to understand and respond to others in conversation. Spoken language is typically characterized by seemingly non-fluent qualities (e.g., fragmentation, pauses, false starts, hesitation, repetition) because of ‘task stress.’ How orally fluent one is can therefore be understood in terms of perception, and whether these qualities of speech can be perceived as expected and natural (i.e., fluent) or unusual and problematic (i.e., non-fluent).
- Oral reading fluency is sometimes distinguished from oral fluency. Oral reading fluency refers to the ability to read words accurately and quickly while using good vocal expression and phrasing. Oral reading fluency is often linked to Schreiber's Theory of Prosody, which places importance on the tone, rhythm, and expressiveness of speech.
- Written or compositional fluency can be measured in a variety of ways. Researchers have measured by length of the composition (especially under timed conditions), words produced per minute, sentence length, or words per clause. Ratio measures (e.g., words per clause, words per sentence, and words per error-free sentence) have historically been most valid and reliable.

=== In second-language acquisition ===
Because an assessment of fluency is typically a measure or characterization of one's language ability, determining fluency may be a more challenging task when the speaker is acquiring a second language. It is generally thought that the later in life a learner approaches the study of a foreign language, the harder it is to acquire receptive (auditory) comprehension and fluent production (speaking) skills. For adults, once their mother tongue has already been established, the acquisition of a second language can come more slowly and less completely, ultimately affecting fluency. However, the critical period hypothesis is a hotly debated topic, with some scholars stating that adults can in fact become fluent in acquiring a second language. For instance, reading and writing skills in a foreign language can be acquired more easily even after the primary language acquisition period of youth is over.

So although it is often assumed that young children learn languages more easily than adolescents and adults, the reverse is in fact true; older learners are faster. The only exception to this rule is in pronunciation. Young children invariably learn to speak their second language with native-like pronunciation, whereas learners who start learning a language at an older age only rarely reach a native-like level.

==== Second-language acquisition in children ====
Since childhood is a critical period, widespread opinion holds that it is easier for young children to learn a second language than it is for adults. Children can even acquire native fluency when exposed to the language on a consistent basis with rich interaction in a social setting. In addition to capacity, factors like; 1) motivation, 2) aptitude, 3) personality characteristics, 4) age of acquisition 5) first language typology 6) socio-economic status and 7) quality and context of L2 input play a role in L2 acquisitions rate and building fluency. Second language acquisition (SLA) has the ability to influence children's cognitive growth and linguistic development.

Skill that consists of ability to produce words in target language develops until adolescence. Natural ability to acquire a new language with a deliberate effort may begin to diminish around puberty i.e. 12–14 years of age. Learning environment, comprehensible instructional materials, teacher, and the learner are indispensable elements in SLA and developing fluency in children.

Paradis (2006) study on childhood language acquisition and building fluency examines how first and second language acquisition patterns are generally similar including vocabulary and morphosyntax. Phonology of first language is usually apparent in SLA and initial L1 influence can be lifelong, even for child L2 learners.

Children can acquire a second language simultaneously (learn L1 and L2 at the same time) or sequentially (learn L1 first and then L2). In the end, they develop fluency in both with one dominant language which is spoken largely by the community they live in.

==== Second-language acquisition in adults ====
The process of learning a second language or "L2," among older learners differs from younger learners because of their working memory. Working memory, also connected to fluency because it deals with automatic responses, is vital to language acquisition. This happens when information is stored and manipulated temporarily. During working memory, words are filtered, processed, and rehearsed, and information is stored while focusing on the next piece of interaction. These false starts, pauses or repetitions found in fluency assessments, can also be found within one's working memory as part of communication.

Those with education at or below a high school level are least likely to take language classes. It has also been found that women and young immigrants are more likely to take language classes. Further, highly educated immigrants who are searching for skilled jobs – which require interpersonal and intercultural skills that are difficult to learn – are the most affected by lower fluency in the L2.

== Speech-language pathology ==
Fluency is a speech language pathology term which means the smoothness or flow with which sounds, syllables, words and phrases are joined when speaking quickly. The term fluency disorder has been used as a collective term for cluttering and stuttering. Both disorders have breaks in the fluidity of speech, and both have the fluency breakdown of repetition of parts of speech.

== Automatic assessment of language fluency ==
Several automatic systems have been developed to assess speech fluency in children or in second-language learners. The first systems used automatic speech recognition to compute objective measures such as speech rate and articulation rate, that were strongly associated with subjective ratings of speech fluency. More recent studies showed that automatic acoustic measures (i.e., without using any automatic speech recognition system) can also be used to measure speech fluency in second-language learners, in children, or in people with aphasia.

== In creativity ==
As of 1988, studies in the assessment of creativity listed fluency as one of the four primary elements in creative thinking, the others being flexibility, originality and elaboration. Fluency in creative thinking is seen as the ability to think of many diverse ideas quickly.

== See also ==
- Linguistics
- Phonics
- Precision teaching
- Reading
- Speech and language pathology
- Speech disfluencies
- Synthetic phonics
- Eye movement in reading
