= Semkovo =

Ski resort in Bulgaria

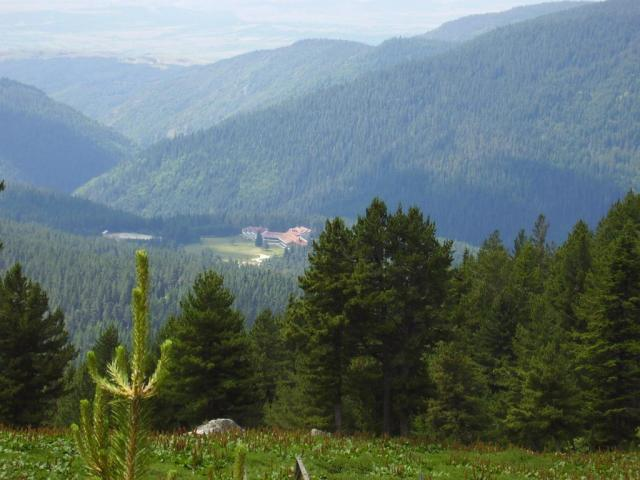

- Location within Bulgaria
- Nearest city: Belitsa (17 km south)
- Coordinates: 42°2′38″N 23°32′2″E

Semkovo (Bulgarian: Семково) is a ski resort in the Rila mountain range of southwestern Bulgaria. It is located at 1750 metres above sea level, and is located 17 kilometres from the town of Belitsa in the Razlog Valley.

The resort situated in the southeastern slopes of Rila, offering views of the Pirin mountain range to the south and surrounded by spruce and pine forests. The Vapski Lakes can be accessed from Semkovo.

Semkovo features several holiday villages and cabins, and has a guest house of the Technical University of Sofia and the guesthouse of the University of Architecture, Geodesy and Civil Engineering. The two universities jointly operate the resort's public ski lifts, providing visitors with access to the resort's ski slopes.

As of 2022, Semkovo was home to the "Coliving Semkovo" project, where a group of digital nomads were revitalizing the former Hotel Rila into a co-op operated coliving space.
