= Electronic fluency device =

Devices intended to improve the fluency of persons who stutter

Electronic fluency devices (also known as assistive devices, electronic aids, altered auditory feedback devices and altered feedback devices) are electronic devices intended to improve the fluency of persons who stutter. Most electronic fluency devices change the sound of the user's voice in their ear.

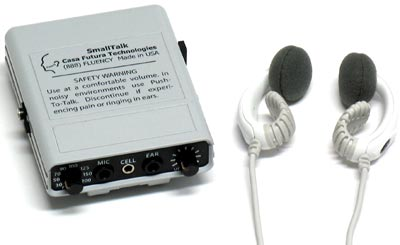
Electronic fluency device

== Types ==
Electronic fluency devices can be divided into two basic categories:

- Computerized feedback devices provide feedback on the physiological control of respiration and phonation, including loudness, vocal intensity and breathing patterns.
- Altered auditory feedback (AAF) devices alter the speech signal so that speakers hear their voices differently.

== Computerized feedback devices ==
Computerized feedback devices (such as CAFET or Dr. Fluency) use computer technology to increase control over breathing and phonation. A microphone gathers information about the stutterer's speech and feedback is delivered on a computer screen. Measurements include intensity (loudness), voice quality, breathing patterns, and voicing strategies. These programs are designed to train features related to prolonged speech, a treatment technique which is frequently used in stuttering therapy. No peer-reviewed studies have been published showing the effectiveness of commercial systems in a clinical context. A study of electromyographic (EMG) feedback in children and adolescents found it to be as effective as other treatments (home-based and clinic-based smooth speech training) in the short and long term.

== Altered auditory feedback devices ==
Altered auditory feedback (AAF) such as singing, choral speaking, masking, delayed or frequency altered feedback have long been known to reduce stuttering. Early altered auditory feedback devices were large and thus confined to the laboratory or therapy room, but advances in electronics have permitted increasingly portable devices such as the Speak For Less FluencyPods, the Voiceamp, the Casa Futura Tech DAF devices, the Derazne Correctophone, the Edinburgh Masker, the Vocaltech Clinical Vocal Feedback Device, the Fluency Master and the SpeechEasy. Current devices may be similar in size and appearance to a hearing aid, including in-the-ear and completely-in-the-canal models.

=== Masking ===
White noise masking has been well documented to reduce stuttering. Clinic-based and portable devices, such as the Edinburgh Masker (since discontinued) have been developed to deliver masking, and found that masking was effective in reducing stuttering, though many found that reduction in stuttering faded with time. Interest in masking reduced during the 1980s as a result of studies finding delayed auditory feedback and frequency altered feedback were more effective in reducing stuttering.

=== Delayed auditory feedback ===
The effect of delayed auditory feedback (DAF) in reducing stuttering has been noted since the 1950s. A DAF user hears their voice in headphones, delayed a fraction of a second. Typical delays are in the 50 millisecond to 200 millisecond range. In stutterers, DAF may produce slow, prolonged but fluent speech. In the 1960s to 1980s, DAF was mainly used to train prolongation and fluency. As the stutterer masters fluent speech skills at a slow speaking rate, the delay is reduced in stages, gradually increasing speaking rate, until the person can speak fluently at a normal speaking rate. It was not until the 1990s that research began to focus on DAF in isolation. Recent studies have moved from longer delays to shorter delays in the 50 millisecond to 75 millisecond range, and have found that speakers can maintain fast rates and achieve increased fluency at these delays. Delayed auditory feedback presented binaurally (i.e. in both ears) is more effective than that presented in monaurally, or in one ear only.

=== Frequency-altered feedback ===
Pitch-shifting frequency-altered auditory feedback (FAF) changes the pitch at which the user hears their voice. Varying pitch from quarter, half or full octave shift typically results in 55–74% decreases stuttering in short reading tasks. Individuals differ as to direction and extent of the pitch shift required to maximally reduce stuttering. In studies that gave longer exposure to FAF and used more meaningful daily life tasks such as generating a monologue, only some participants experienced a reduction in stuttering. Initial claims that AAF was more powerful than FAF in reducing stuttering have not been supported by subsequent research. FAF is, like DAF, more effective when presented binaurally. In the last years a number of smart phone apps have been developed that implement DAF/FAF as software and are much cheaper than the special hardware devices.

=== Effectiveness ===
Studies have shown that altered auditory feedback (including delayed auditory feedback, frequency altered feedback) as provided by devices such as the Speak For Less FluencyPods (only uses delayed Auditory Feedback, not frequency altered feedback), the Casa Futura School DAF machine or SpeechEasy can immediately reduce stuttering by 40–80% in reading tasks. Laboratory studies suggest that reductions in stuttering with an electronic fluency device can occur without a reduced speech rate, and that speech naturalness is often enhanced with AAF. However, the effects of altered feedback are highly individualistic, with some obtaining considerable increases in fluency, while others receive little or no benefit.

A 2006 review of stuttering treatments noted that three treatment studies of the SpeechEasy device did not meet the criteria for experimental quality. In addition, studies have been critiqued for failing to demonstrate ecological validity; in particular that AAF effects continue over the long term and in everyday speaking situations. The high-profile promotion in the media of devices such as the "SpeechEasy" has been criticized as inappropriate given the lack of scientific evidence for their effectiveness.

There are few published studies on the effect of the AAF in the daily activities of life; studies have mainly examined the effect of AAF on short oral reading tasks, with some studying the giving of a monologue that is usually short in duration. Several studies have produced group results that stutterers using the SpeechEasy show greater reductions in reading than for monologue and conversation. Using AAF was effective in reducing stuttering in scripted telephone calls and giving presentations according to two studies. Another study examining the effects of the SpeechEasy in more naturalistic situations (conversation and asking questions of strangers outside the clinic) found that the SpeechEasy failed to show a significant effect following six months of use, though individual subjects varied in their response. A further study examining the use of the device during phone and face to face conversation also found wide variations in stuttering reduction, with just under half exhibiting stable improvement over the course of the four months of the study.

While there is evidence of the immediate, short-term effectiveness of AAF devices in reducing stuttering, the longterm effects of altered feedback are unclear. There is some limited experimental data that in some speakers the effect of AAF may fade after a few minutes of exposure, and some anecdotal reports suggest that over time users receive continued but lessened effects from their device. While one group study has reported continued overall reductions in stuttering after a year of daily use of the SpeechEasy on reading and a monologue task, others have found that some participants showed adaptation effects, gaining less benefit from the device after exposure for several months, including stuttering more with the device than without it. Some studies of various altered auditory feedback devices have noted carryover fluency, i.e. a reduction in stuttering after the stutterer removes an electronic fluency device, while others have not.

The effective of electronic fluency devices as measured by qualitative measures and ratings by stutterers have also been made. Studies show that some stutterers report improved fluency and confidence about speaking, and less severe stuttering and some carryover effects; the device is perceived as being particularly useful on the telephone. They reported that the device was difficult to use in noisy situations as the device amplifies all voices and sounds, and some acclimatization to the use of the device over time. Qualitative reports of satisfaction may be disassociated from more objective measures of fluency: some stutterers who gain little or no benefit from a device based on objective measures rate the device highly, while others who were obtaining benefit on measures of fluency reported negatives opinions about the device.

=== Use with children ===
There is little experimental evaluation of the therapeutic effect of AAF on children who stutter: one study noted that effects of FAF were less in children than adults. Given the lack of evidence of its effectiveness, as well as concerns about the impact of altered feedback on developing speech and language systems, some authors have expressed the view that the use of an AAF with children would be unethical.

=== Causes of altered auditory feedback effects ===
The precise reasons for the fluency-inducing effects of AAF in stutterers are unknown. Early investigators suggested that those who stutter had an abnormal speech–auditory feedback loop that was corrected or bypassed while speaking under DAF. Later researchers proposed increased fluency was actually caused by the changes in speech production, including slower speech rates, higher pitches and increased loudness, rather than the AAF per se. However, subsequent studies have noted that increased fluency occurred in some stutterers at normal and fast rates using DAF. Some suggest that stuttering is caused by defective auditory processing, and that AAF helps to correct the misperceived rhythmic structure of speech. It has been shown that some stutterers have noted that have atypical auditory anatomy and that DAF improved fluency in these stutterers but not in those with typical anatomy. However, positron emission tomography studies on choral reading in stutterers suggest that AAF also made changes in motor and speech production areas of the brain, as well as the auditory processing areas. Choral reading reduced the overactivity in motor areas that is found with stuttered reading, and largely reversed the left-hemisphere based auditory-system and speech production system underactivation. Noting that the effects of altered feedback vary from person to person and can wear off over time, distraction has also been proposed as a possible cause of stuttering reduction with AAF.
