= Lyutovo =

Lyutovo Лютово
- Village
- Location within Bulgaria
- Coordinates: 41°57′N 23°38′E
- Country: Bulgaria
- Province: Blagoevgrad Province
- Municipality: Belitsa

Government
  - Suffragan Mayor: Ibrahim Palev

Area
  - Total: 5,477 km^{2} (2,115 sq mi)
- Elevation: 1,268 m (4,160 ft)

Population (15 December 2010)
  - Total: 242
- GRAO
- Time zone: UTC+2 (EET)
  - Summer (DST): UTC+3 (EEST)
- Postal Code: 2791
- Area code: 074404

Lyutovo (Bulgarian: Лютово) is a village in the municipality of Belitsa, in Blagoevgrad Province, Bulgaria. It is located approximately 15 km east of Belitsa and 85.5 kilometres southeast from Sofia. As of 2010 it had a population of 242 people. The population is Muslim of pomak origin.
