= Kraishte, Blagoevgrad Province =

Kraishte Краище
- Village
- Location within Bulgaria
- Coordinates: 41°53′58″N 23°35′32″E
- Country: Bulgaria
- Province: Blagoevgrad Province
- Municipality: Belitsa

Government
  - Mayor: Moussa Mizur (DPS)

Area
  - Total: 10,523 km^{2} (4,063 sq mi)
- Elevation: 896 m (2,940 ft)

Population (15-12-2010)
  - Total: 2,375
- GRAO
- Time zone: UTC+2 (EET)
  - Summer (DST): UTC+3 (EEST)
- Postal Code: 2781
- Area code: 074405

Kraishte (Bulgarian: Краище) is a village in the municipality of Belitsa, in Blagoevgrad Province, Bulgaria. It is located approximately 4 kilometers south from Belitsa and 88 kilometers southeast from Sofia. As of 2010 it had a population of 2375 people. The population is Muslim of pomak origin. The village is situated on the eastern bank of Mesta river on the secondary road from Razlog to Velingrad and on the Septemvri-Dobrinishte narrow gauge line. The station of Belitsa is actually in the village of Kraishte.

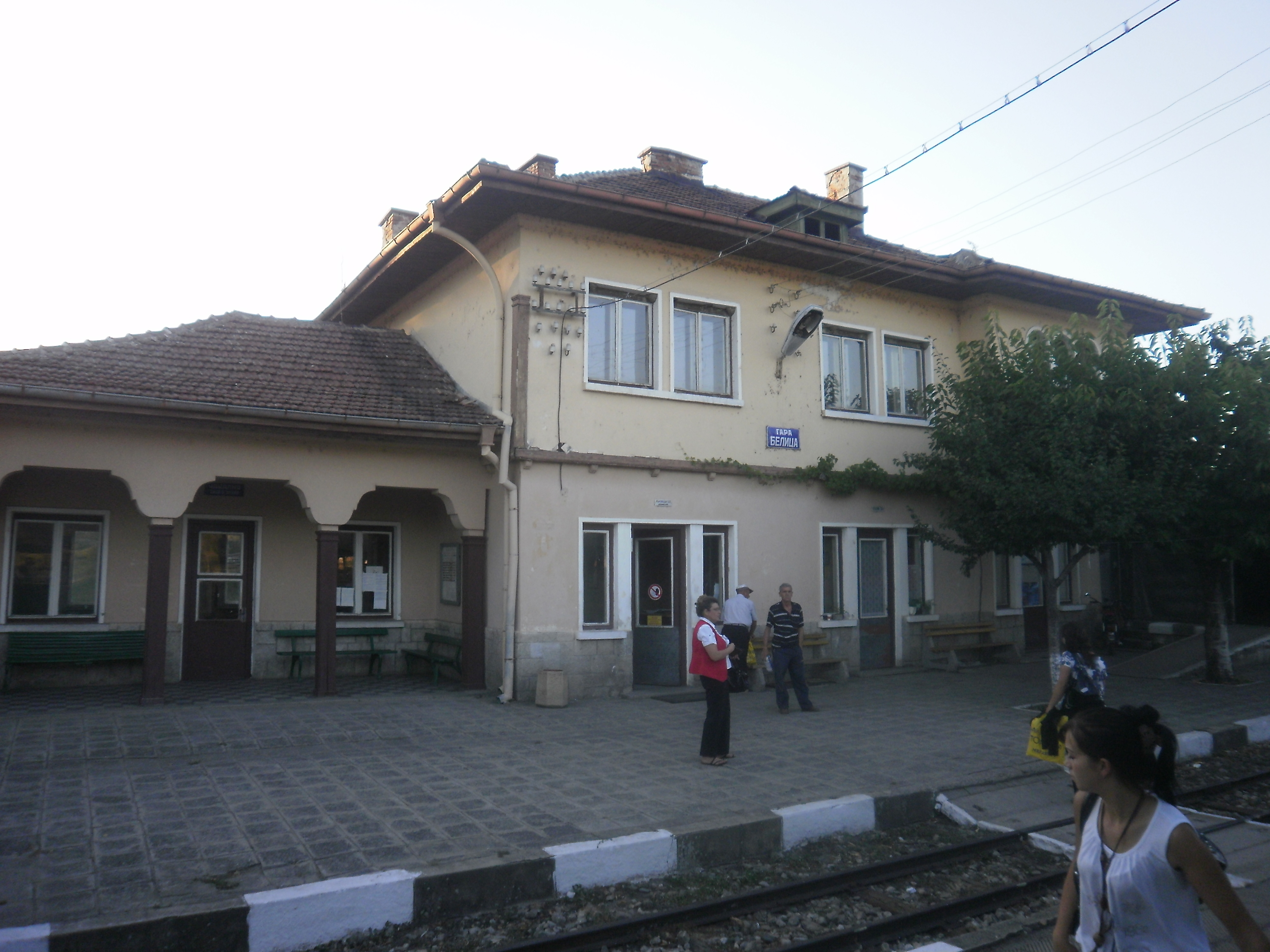
Belitsa train station in Kraishte

The village has central water supply and sewerage. The electricity is provided by aerial wires. There is a primary school "Peyo Yavorov" and a public library and a post office.
