= Razlog =

Razlog Разлог
- Town
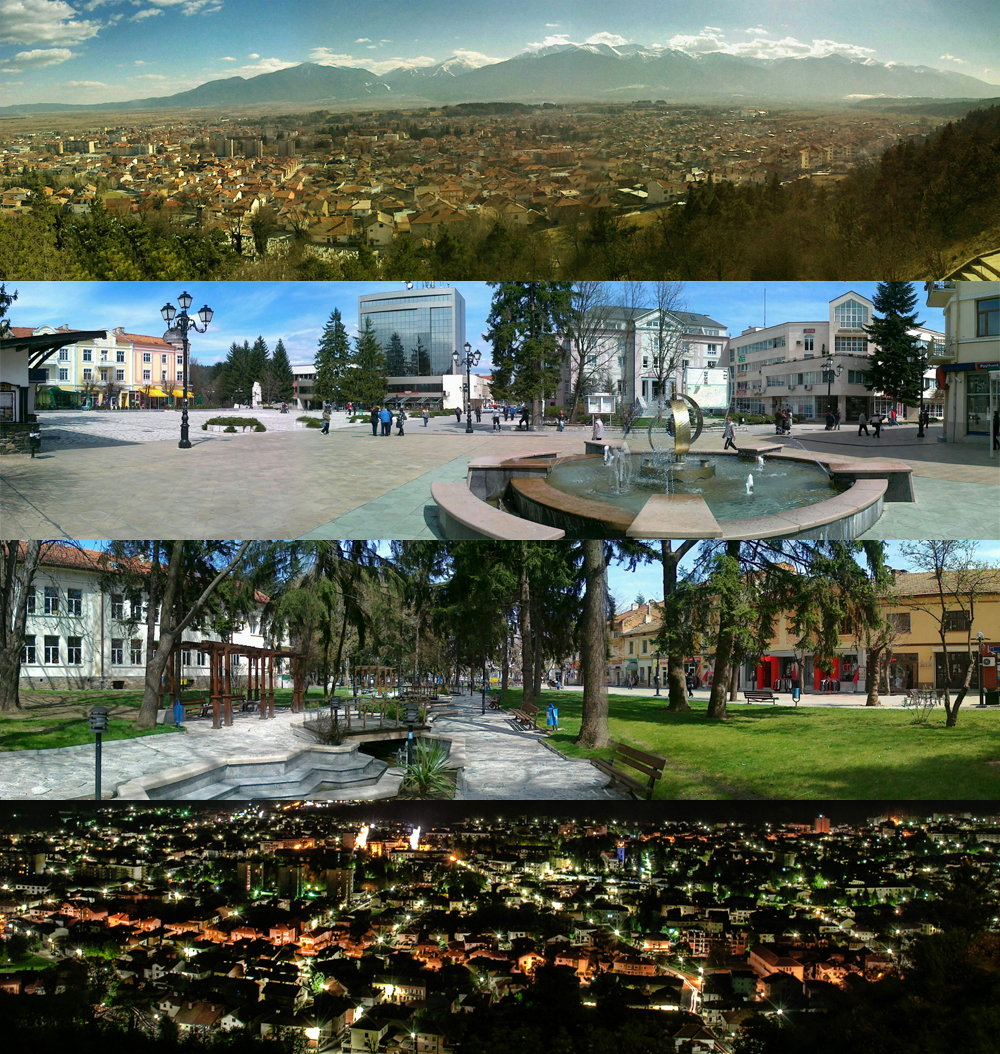
- Razlog skyline, Preobrazhenie Square, Central Park, Razlog skyline at night

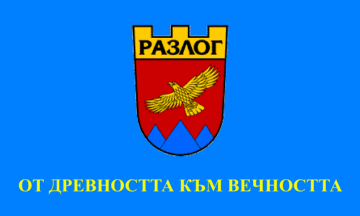
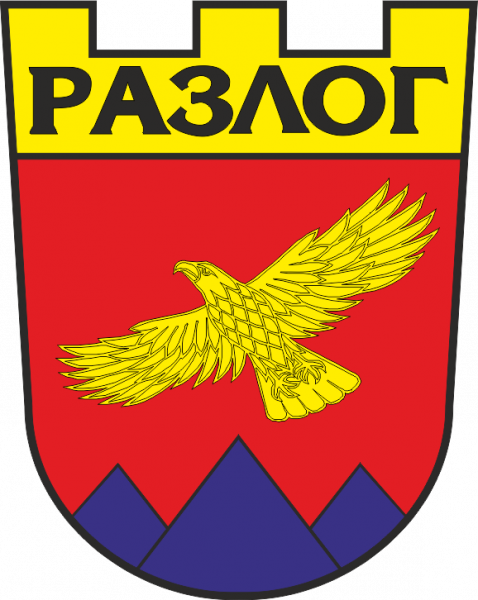
- Flag Coat of arms

- Location of Razlog
- Coordinates: 41°53′N 23°28′E
- Country: Bulgaria
- Province (Oblast): Blagoevgrad

Government
  - Mayor: Krasimir Gerchev - removed due to conflict
- Elevation: 812 m (2,664 ft)

Population (2009-09-15)
  - Total: 13,448
- Time zone: UTC+2 (EET)
  - Summer (DST): UTC+3 (EEST)
- Postal Code: 2760
- Area code: 0747

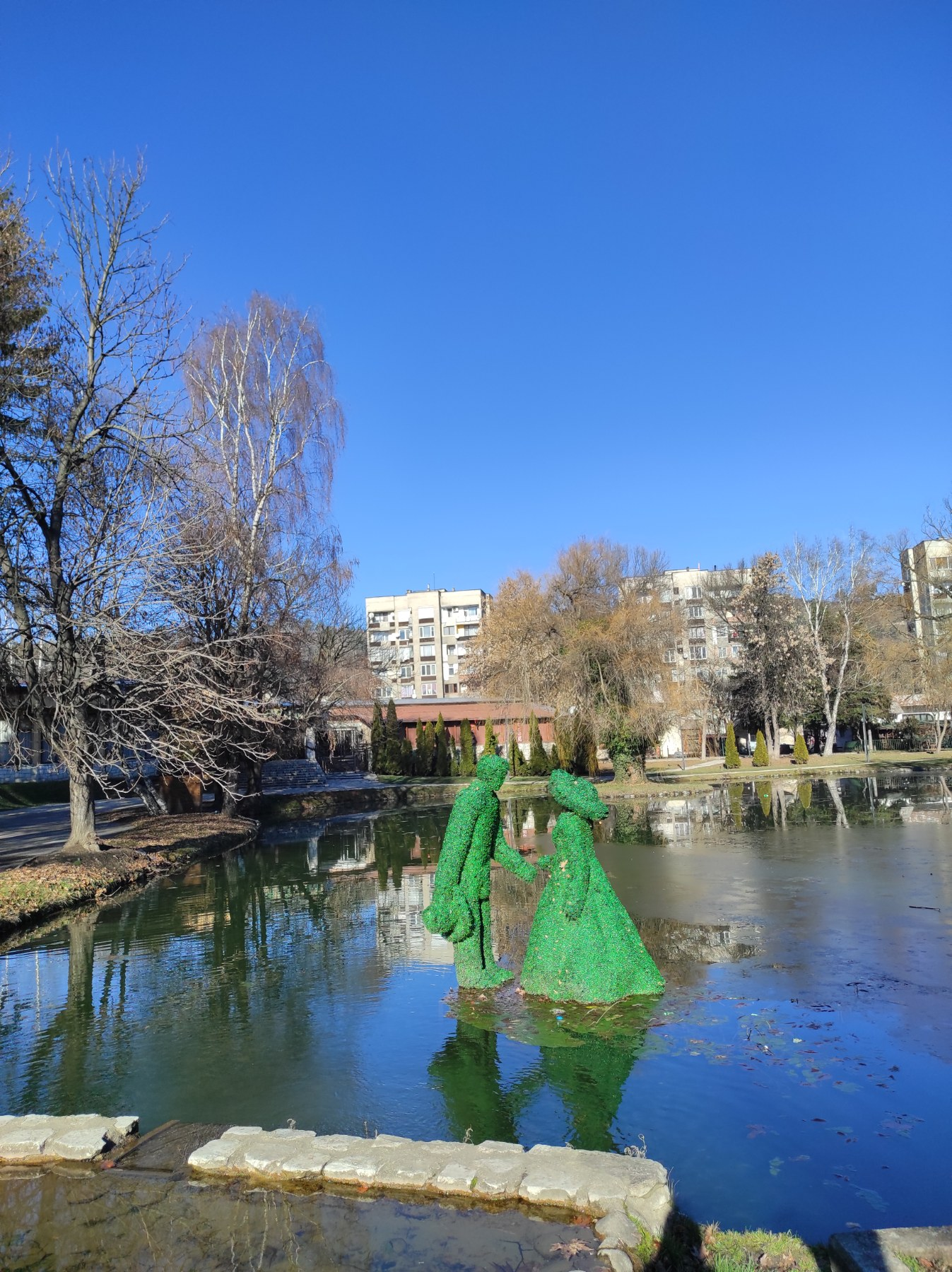

Razlog (Bulgarian: Разлог [rɐzˈɫɔk], formerly Mehomiya, Мехомия) is a town and ski resort in Razlog Municipality, Blagoevgrad Province in southwestern Bulgaria. It is situated in the Razlog Valley.

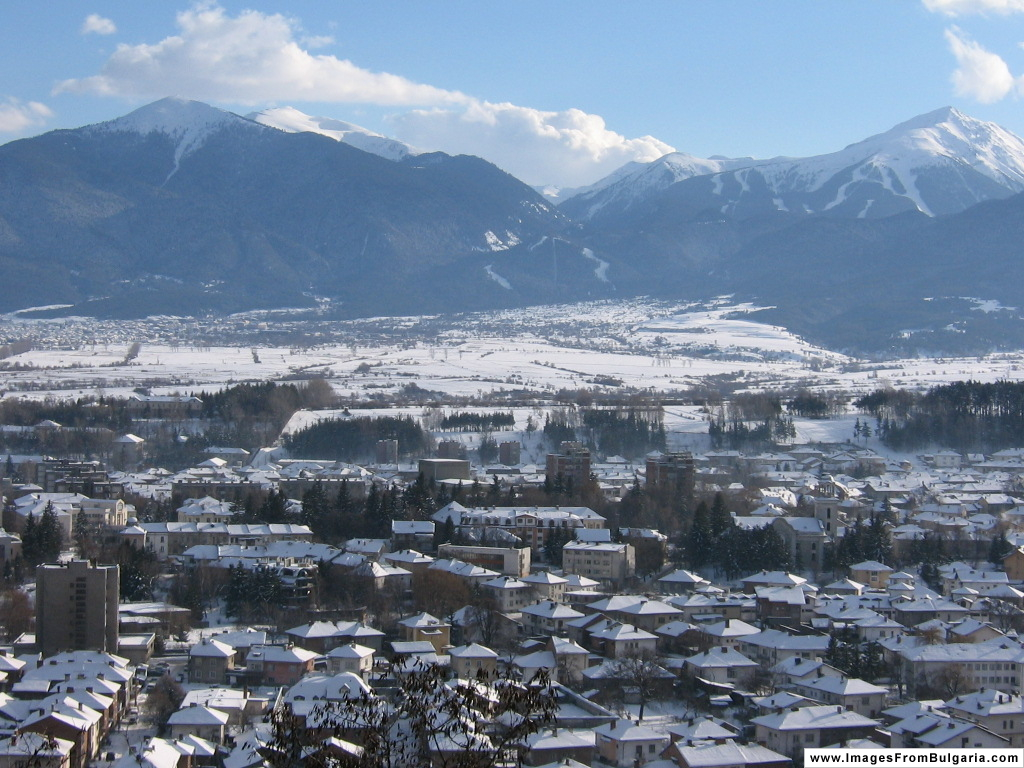
View over Razlog with the mountains in the background

== History ==
During his 1894–1896 trip in the region of Macedonia, Bulgarian geographer Vasil Kanchov visited Razlog (then known as Мехомия, Mehomiya) and reported that it numbered 820 households, of which 500 of Eastern Orthodox Bulgarians, 300 of Muslim Bulgarians (Pomaks), 16 of Protestant Bulgarians and 5 of Eastern Orthodox Aromanians, for a total population of around 4,620. According to the same author's 1900 study on the population of Macedonia, Razlog was populated by 4,970 people, consisting of 3,200 Christian Bulgarians, 1,460 Muslim Bulgarians, 80 Turks, 200 Romani and 30 Aromanians.

The town's population actively participated in the Kresna-Razlog and Ilinden-Preobrazhenie Uprising, Razlog, which was part of the Sanjak of Siroz in the Salonika Vilayet as "Razlık", itself being liberated from Ottoman rule in 1912.

In 1925, the town was renamed from Mehomia to Razlog.

The municipality of Razlog and the whole Razlog valley possess rich inheritance of cultural monuments from different ages and civilizations. There are seven cultural monuments in the territory of Razlog. These are the Christian temples: Saint Georgi Pobedonoset (built in 1834 in Razlog); Saint Gerogii (built in 1834 in Banya village); Uspenie Bogorodichno (built in 1835 in Dolno Draglishte village) — the iconostasis in this temple was made by one of the most prominent representatives of the wood-carving school in Tryavna: Dosyu Koyuv; Saint Bogoroditsa in Dolno Draglishte village, specialists suppose that the temple was built before the 16th century; Sretenie Gospodne (built in 1860 in Dobarsko village); and Saint Theodor Тiron and Theodor Stratilat (built in 1614 in Dobarsko village). This temple has unique mural paintings; it is a cultural monument under the protection of UNESCO.

There are 70 houses in the municipality, which are archeological monuments. They are mainly from the age of the Revival — the so-called "Razlog-Chepino" houses.

The historic museum in Razlog presents a collection of pottery from the 19-20th century, local traditional hand-made textiles and bell-mouldings.

During the Second Balkan War (1913), the area around the town was a major battlefield between the Greek and Bulgarian armies. The town was captured by the Greek forces on 9 July (O.S.), recaptured by the Bulgarians on 16 July, and again to the Greeks on 18 July. After the following peace treaty Razlog was ceded to Bulgaria.

Razlog developed as a centre of winter tourism in the 1990s and 2000s owing to its favourable position in the vicinity of the Pirin, Rila and Rhodope mountains.

== Culture ==
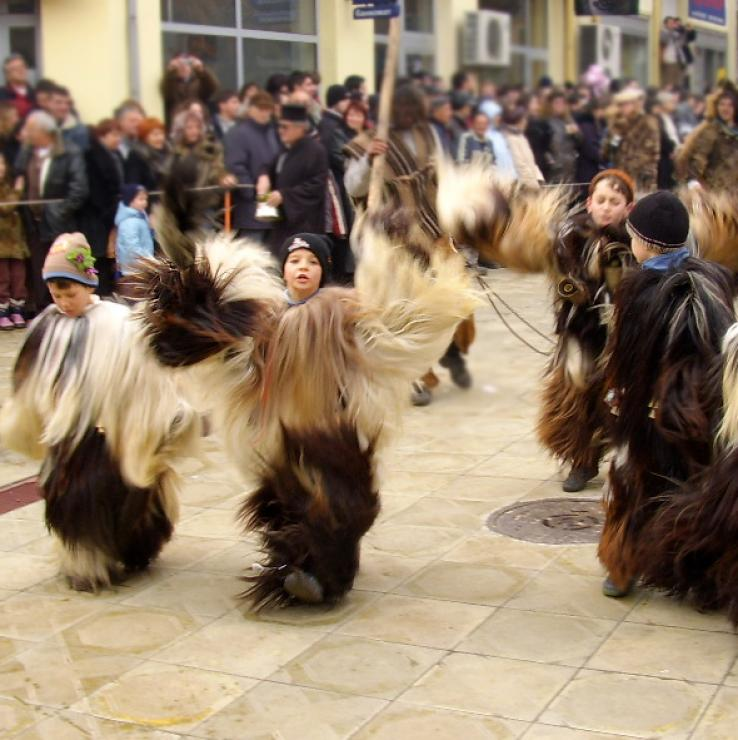
Kukeri: New Year Carnival in Razlog

Two of the most significant folklore events in Bulgaria are organized and held in Razlog. These are the New Year's Kukeri holidays and the gathering for folk art "Pirin sings".

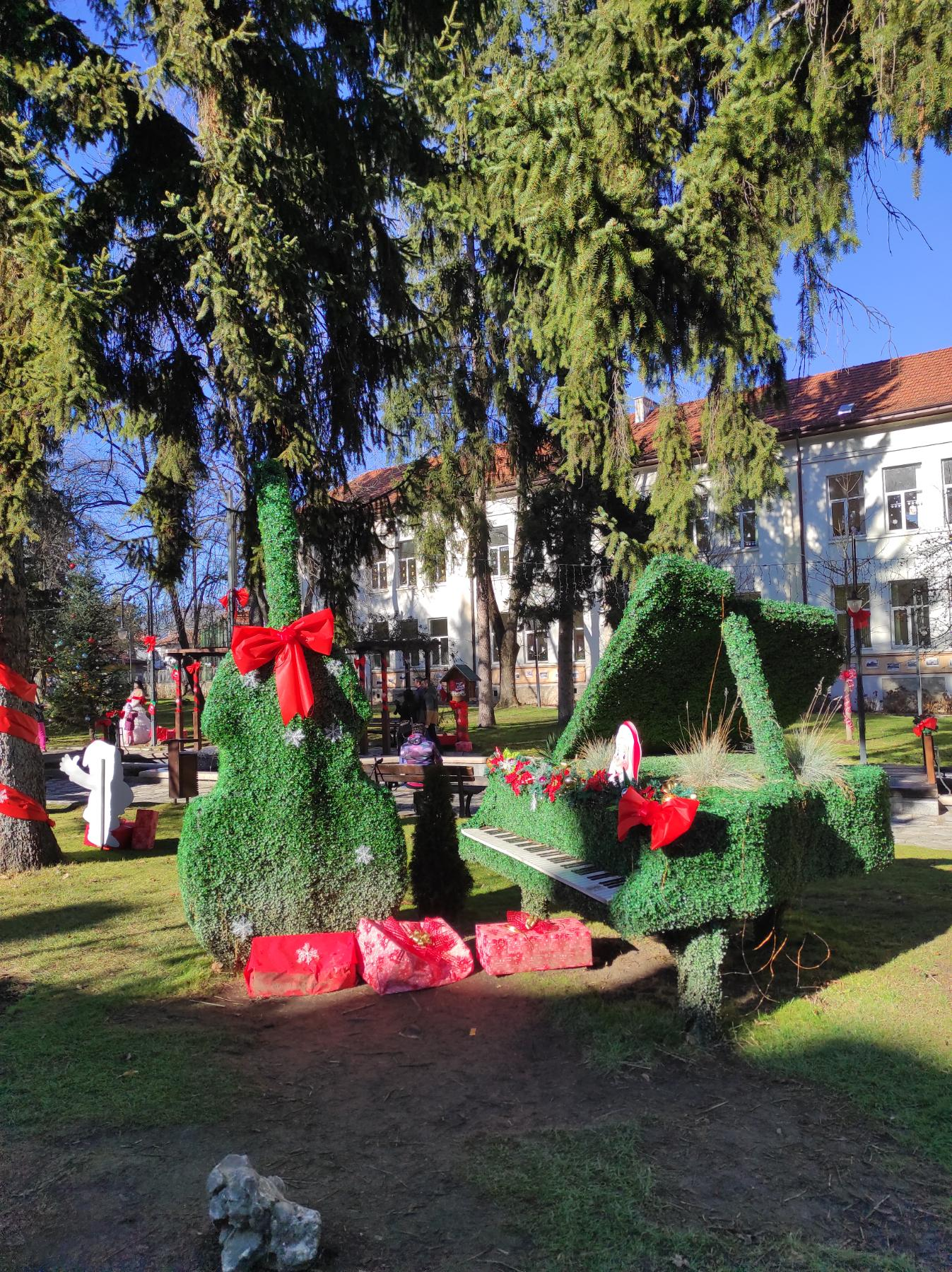

Unique is the gathering for folk art "Pirin songs" in the "Yavorov" hut.

== Twin towns ==
- Pineto, Italy (since 2016 in the frameworks of the SISTERS Twinning project)
- Šibenik, Croatia (since 2016 in the frameworks of the SISTERS Twinning project)

== Cityscape ==
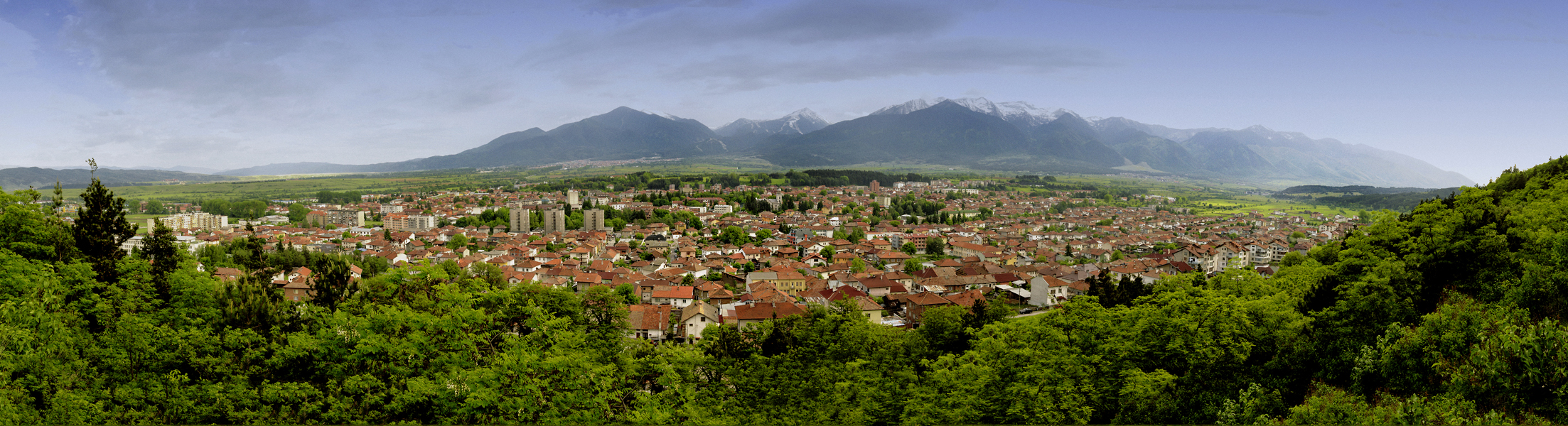
View of Razlog and Pirin mountains
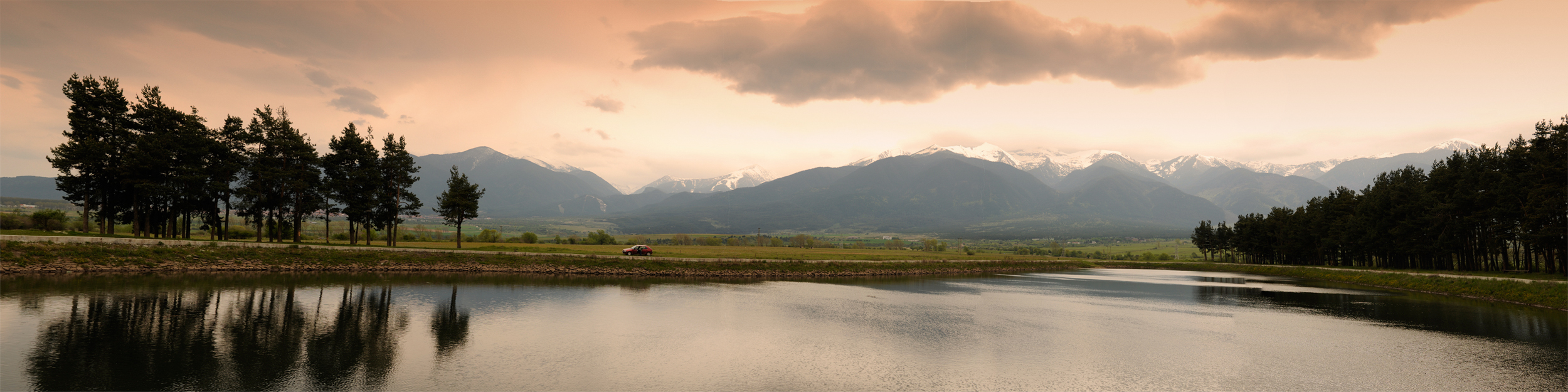
View of lake near Razlog and Pirin mountains

== See also ==
Razlog Cove on Livingston Island in the South Shetland Islands, Antarctica, which is named after Razlog.
