= Belitsa =

Belitsa Белица (Bulgarian)
- Town
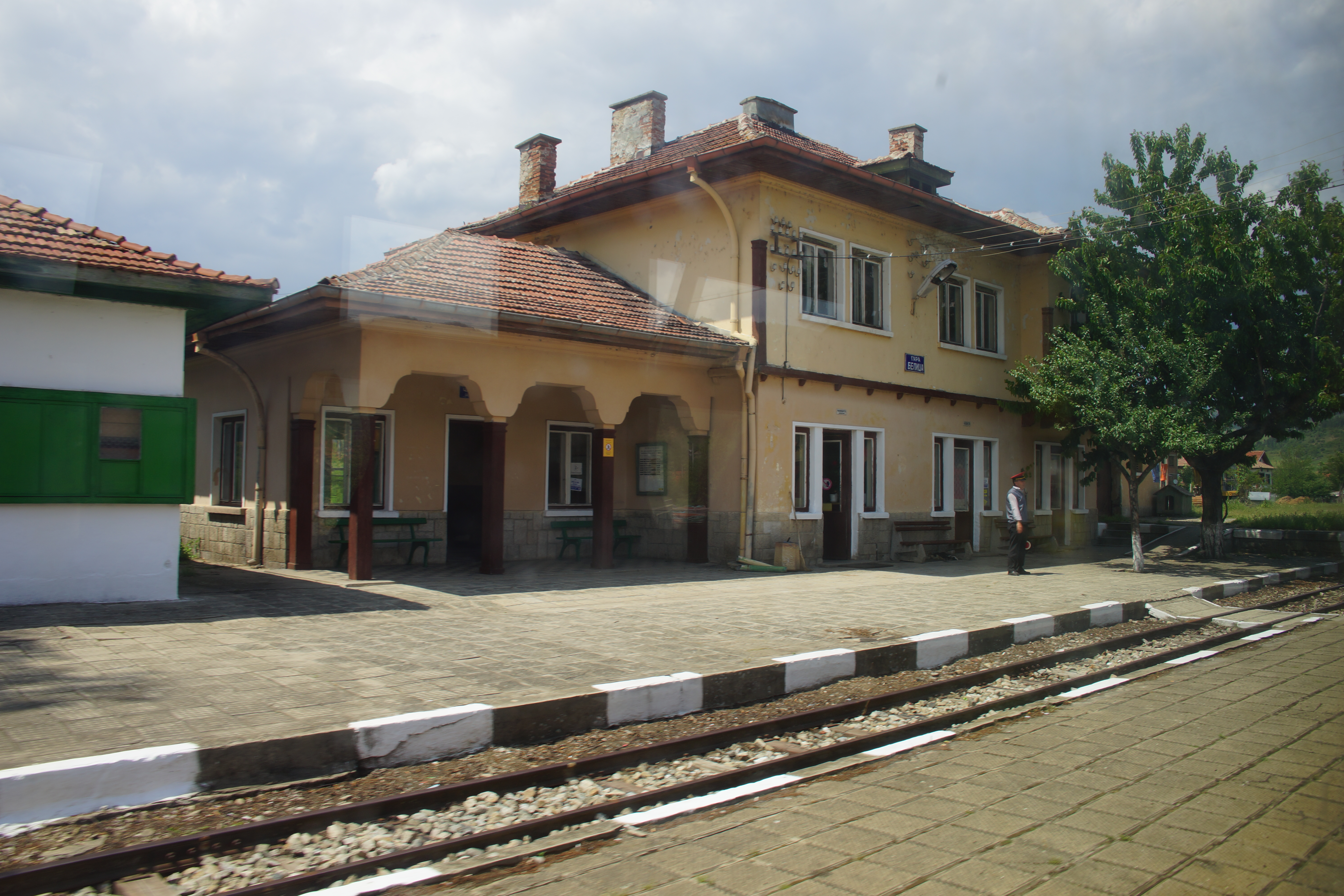
- Belitsa train station

- Location within Bulgaria
- Coordinates: 41.95°N 23.566667°E
- Country: Bulgaria
- Province: Blagoevgrad
- Municipality: Belitsa

Area
  - Total: 72.923 km^{2} (28.156 sq mi)
- Elevation: 953 m (3,127 ft)
- Postal code: 2780
- Area code: 07444

Belitsa (Bulgarian: Белица [bɛˈlit͡sɐ]) is a town in southwestern Bulgaria, the administrative center of Belitsa Municipality, in Blagoevgrad Province. According to data from the NSI, its population was 2,943 in 2025.

== Geography ==
Belitsa is the administrative center of Belitsa Municipality, in the northeastern part of the Razlog Valley and the Blagoevgrad region, along the valley of the Mesta river, between the southern slopes of the eastern Rila mountains and the northern slopes of the Veliishko-Videnishki part of the western Rhodope Mountains. It borders the municipalities of Yakoruda, Bansko, Razlog, Rila, Samokov, and Velingrad.

It is connected (from the main Razlog–Velingrad road) to the international routes E79 and E80, which provides accessibility to Sofia (172 km) and Blagoevgrad (72 km).

The region's climate is transitional continental with Mediterranean influence, and alpine in the higher parts of the mountains.

== History ==
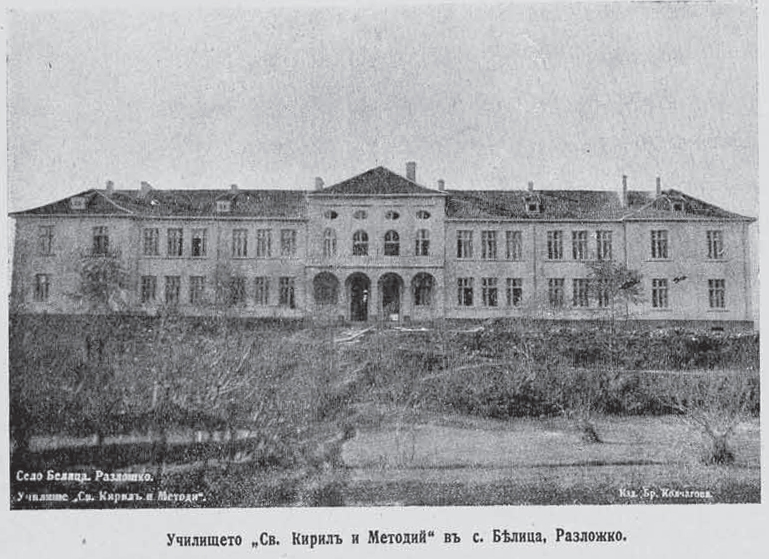
The exarchal school in Belitsa, St. Cyril and Methodius

The area of Belitsa first fell into the hands of the Roman Empire. The Romans made many settlements larger in the Razlog valley and led Hellenized and Romanized colonists into them.

Belitsa is recorded for the first time in Tatarpazardzhiyska province (kaza) of the Ottoman Empire in 1516, under the name Belitsa, together with Little Belitsa (Bulgarian: Малка Белица, Malka Belitsa).

In the 19th century, it was a Christian-Muslim village in the Nevropska kaaza of the Ottoman Empire. In The Ethnography of the Vilayets Adrianopole, Manastir, and Salonica in Constantinople (now Istanbul) in 1878 and statistics reflecting the male population from 1873, Belitsa (Bielitsa) is shown as a village with 303 households, 640 Bulgarian Christians, and 250 Pomaks. In agreement with the statistics of Vasil Kanchov, c. 1900, Belitsa is a mixed Bulgarian-Christian and Bulgarian-Muslim village. 2,700 Bulgarian Christians live in it, as well as 550 Pomaks and 50 Vlachs.

During 1833–1855, under the control of Pope Iliya, the church of Saint George was built. Construction was unusually slow due to opposition from the local Turkish government, which would often destroy what progress the Christians had made. The church was built contrary to the laws of the empire, in a high and visible part of the village, its domes visible from everywhere. As a compromise, Belitsan Christians convinced the local authority to bring a clock face from Vienna, which would be mounted on the highest dome.

In 1903, during the Ilinden-Preobrazhenie Uprising, the church was burned down and the clock fell to the ground, stopping at 16:00. Its parts were collected by the Bulgarian Muslims and later handed back to the returning Christians.

During the Russo-Turkish War from 1877 to 1878, under the Samara flag, 19 Belitsan volunteers fought at Svishtov, Rousse, Sheinovo, and Shipka. They returned to their village with many medals and honors and were received with delight by their neighbours. Belitsan volunteers were also involved in the Kresna-Razlog Uprising as well as the training and fighting at Razlog. A large number of the volunteers were sent to prison or forced to leave the village.

In 1891, Georgi Strezov wrote of Belitsa:

Belitsa, a large village 3 hours northeast from Mehomia: located in a corner, which is formed from the Yakorudska river and [the] Belitsa. Below the village, at the tip of the corner, was the place of Old Belitsa. People say that the modern Belitsa was created 250 years ago by the citizens of Old Belitsa, who were forced to run from the citizens of Kardzhali. East of the village, above a slope is the consecrated "St. Elijah", visible everywhere. Above that area, up to 200 tall pine trees, which create a large copse above the church. In the village, two large towers stand out, each 9 stories tall, left from the Janissaries. The church "St. Georgi" is elevated and at the edge of the village; below the church is a small school, built in 1875. There are 3 teachers and around 150 students, girls and boys. The surrounding area is bare; the ground is the best in Razlog. Because of the scarcity of land, many leave the village and go to other areas, most of them going to Vlashko [an area on the border of Romania], where they make boza. There are 500 houses, of which 110 are inhabited by Pomaks.

In 1903, in retaliation for its participation in the Ilinden Uprising, Belitsa was burned to the ground; over 475 people died.

After the beginning of the First Balkan War, 49 people from Belitsa took part in the Macedonian-Adrianople volunteer regiments.

After the Second Balkan War in 1913, Belitsa remained in Bulgarian territory. According to Dimitar Gadzhanov, in 1916, Belitsa was a mixed Bulgarian-Pomak village, the Pomaks numbering around 400.

In 1920, the Rila Planina forest labour production cooperative was formed. In 1935, it had 480 members.

== Economy ==
The economy of Belitsa is based primarily on small workshops in the wood processing and sewing industries as well as in tourism, centered around the mountain resort of Semkovo. According to municipal economic planning data, there are over 230 registered non-financial businesses operating in the municipality, predominantly micro-enterprises in trade, repair services, manufacturing, and hospitality.

Agricultural land accounts for 63,205 decares out of the municipality's total area of 293,536 decares, with the remainder consisting largely of forest territories (221,862 decares).

== Public institutions ==
The Georgi Todorov community centre has a history spanning over a century. It was created in 1885 by returning war volunteers, who brought Bulgarian and Russian books from free Bulgaria to educate local residents. Although local Ottoman authorities restricted its activities, citizens preserved the books and formally registered the institution in 1908.

== Notable residents ==
- Vladimir Poptomov (1890–1952), politician and diplomat
- George Andreytchine (1894–1950), journalist, trade union organiser, and diplomat
- İbrahim Ethem Akıncı (1889–1950), Turkish bureaucrat, guerrilla leader, and akinji during the 1919–1922 Greco-Turkish War.

== Religion ==
Belitsa's population is religiously mixed, with both Christians and Muslims.

== Points of interest ==
- The town's historical museum, whose collection dates to 1968 and which opened in 1995, houses seven departments, including archaeology, ethnography, and a local crafts.
- Bear Sanctuary Belitsa, a 12-hectare rescue centre for former dancing bears and captive brown bears, operated by Four Paws and Fondation Brigitte Bardot since 2000, is located near the town.

== Honour ==
Belitsa Peninsula on Graham Land in Antarctica is named after Belitsa.
