= Demyanitsa =

River in south-western Bulgaria

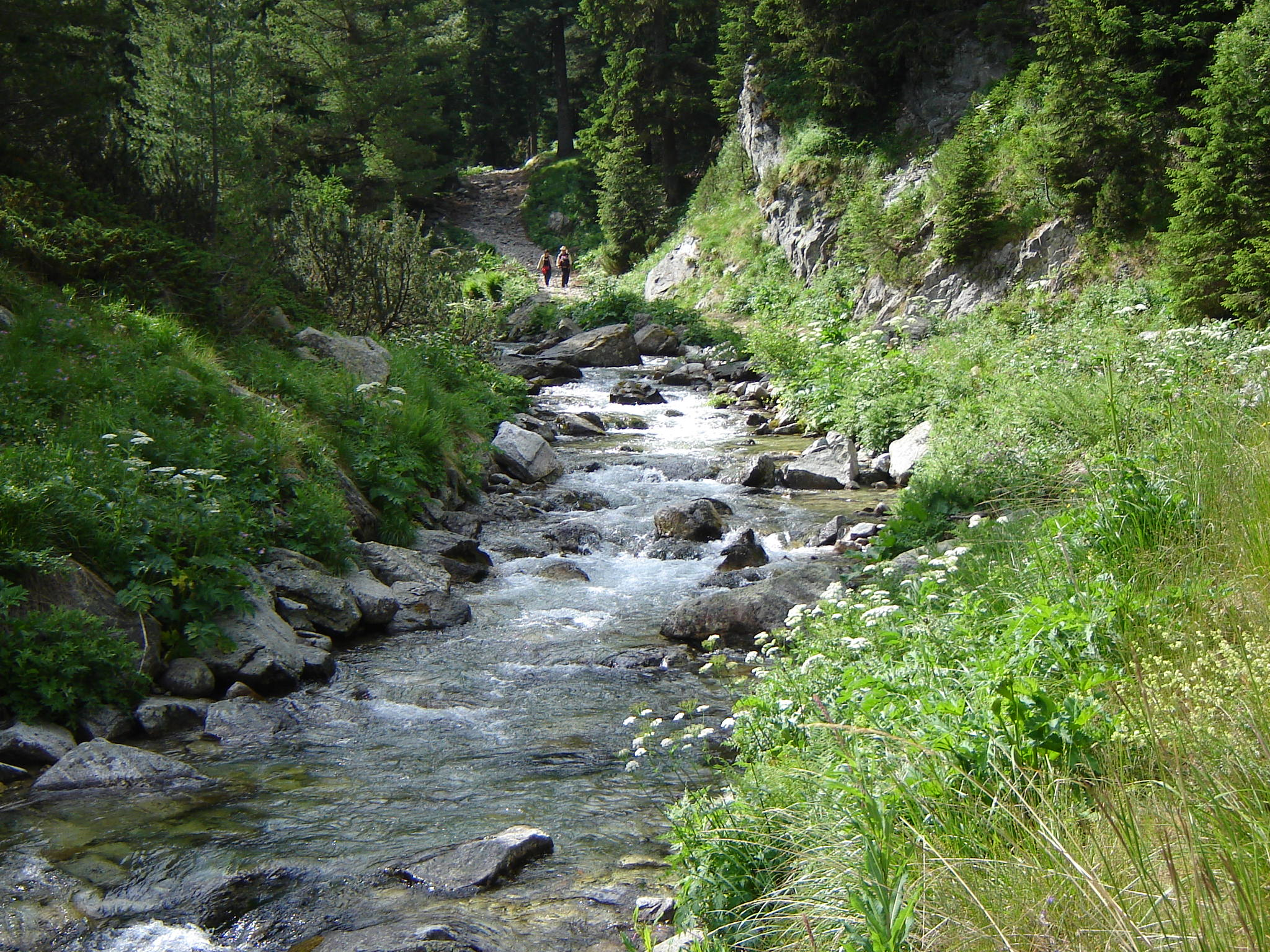

Location
- Country: Bulgaria

Physical characteristics
- Source
  - location: Valyavishki Lakes, Pirin
  - elevation: 2,400 m (7,900 ft)
- Mouth
  - location: Glazne
  - coordinates: 41°49′0.83″N 23°28′14.16″E
  - elevation: 1,063 m (3,488 ft)
- Length: 13.6 km (8.5 mi)
- Basin size: 37 km^{2} (14 sq mi)

Basin features
- Progression: Glazne→ Iztok→ Mesta

The Demyanitsa (Bulgarian: Демяница) is a river in south-western Bulgaria, a right tributary of the Glazne, which flows into the Iztok, itself a right tributary of the river Mesta. The river is 13.6 km long and drains parts of the northeastern slopes of the Pirin mountain range. It is sometimes considered as the main branch of the Glazne.

The river takes its source from the Valyavishki Lakes, at an altitude of 2,400 m in northern Pirin. It initially flows to the west and at the Tiyatsite locality it turns northwards. It flows at an average gradient of 102 m/km, forming numerous jumps and waterfalls. Near the Demyanitsa refuge the Demyanitsa takes two tributaries, the Vasilashka Reka (left) and the Gazeyska Reka (right), followed by two more tributaries further downstream, the Karkamska Reka (left) and the Yulen (right). The numerous tributaries make the river relatively abounding in water for its size, with average discharge of 1.5 m^{3}/s. At 1.5 km from the Demyanitsa refuge it forms the Demyanishki Skok waterfall (11 m) at altitude of 1,750 m; at 1,650 m it forms another waterfall, the Yulenski Skok (9 m). Both waterfalls were declared natural landmarks in 1965. At 400 m southwest of the town of Bansko at an altitude of 1,063 m, the Demyanitsa merges with the river Banderitsa, forming the river Glazne.

Its drainage basin covers a territory of 37 km^{2} and includes six glacial lake groups in Pirin — Vasilashki, Valyavishki, Prevalski, Tipitski, Karkamski and Gazeyski. Its valley is covered with coniferous forests.

== Gallery ==
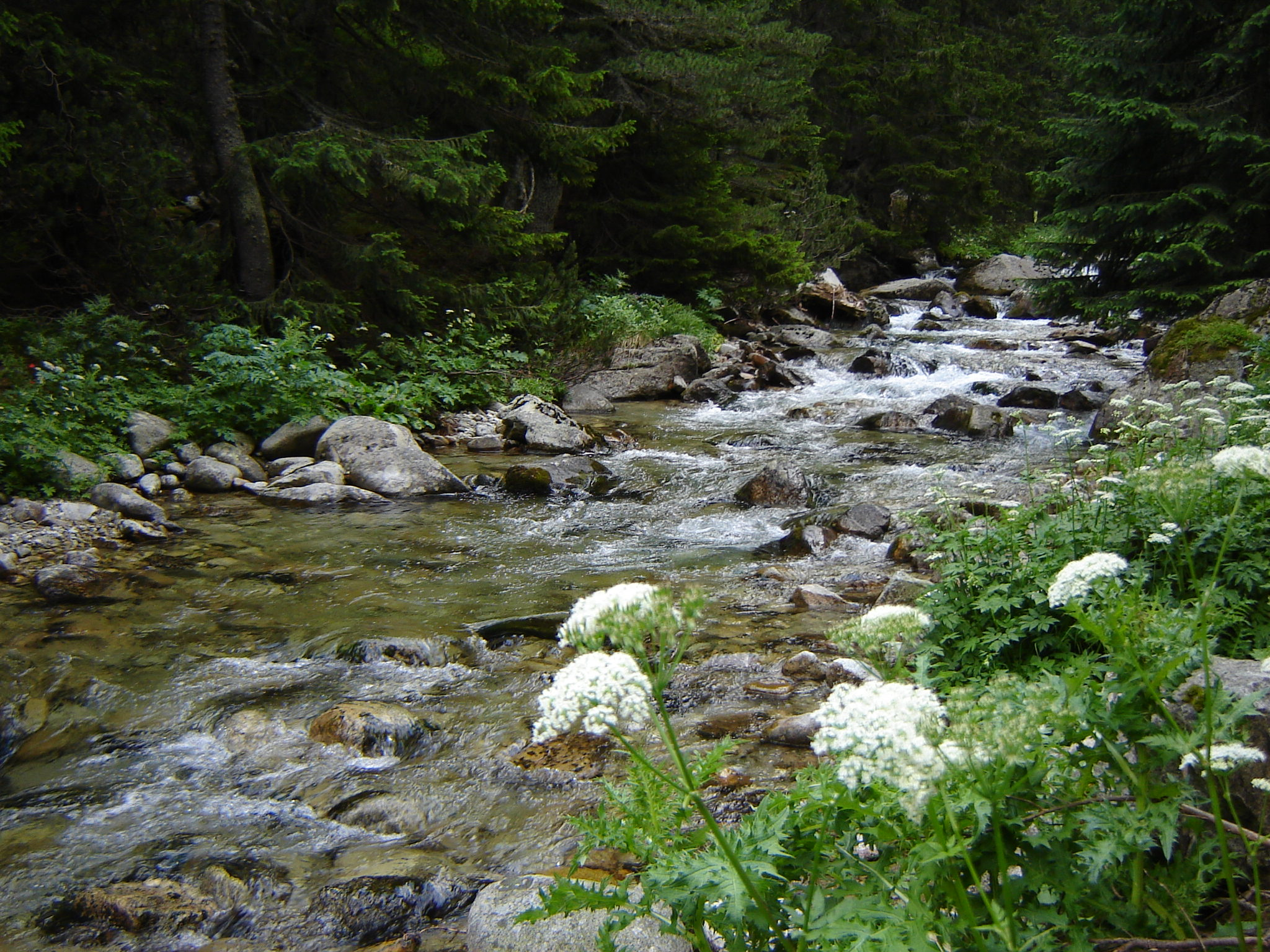

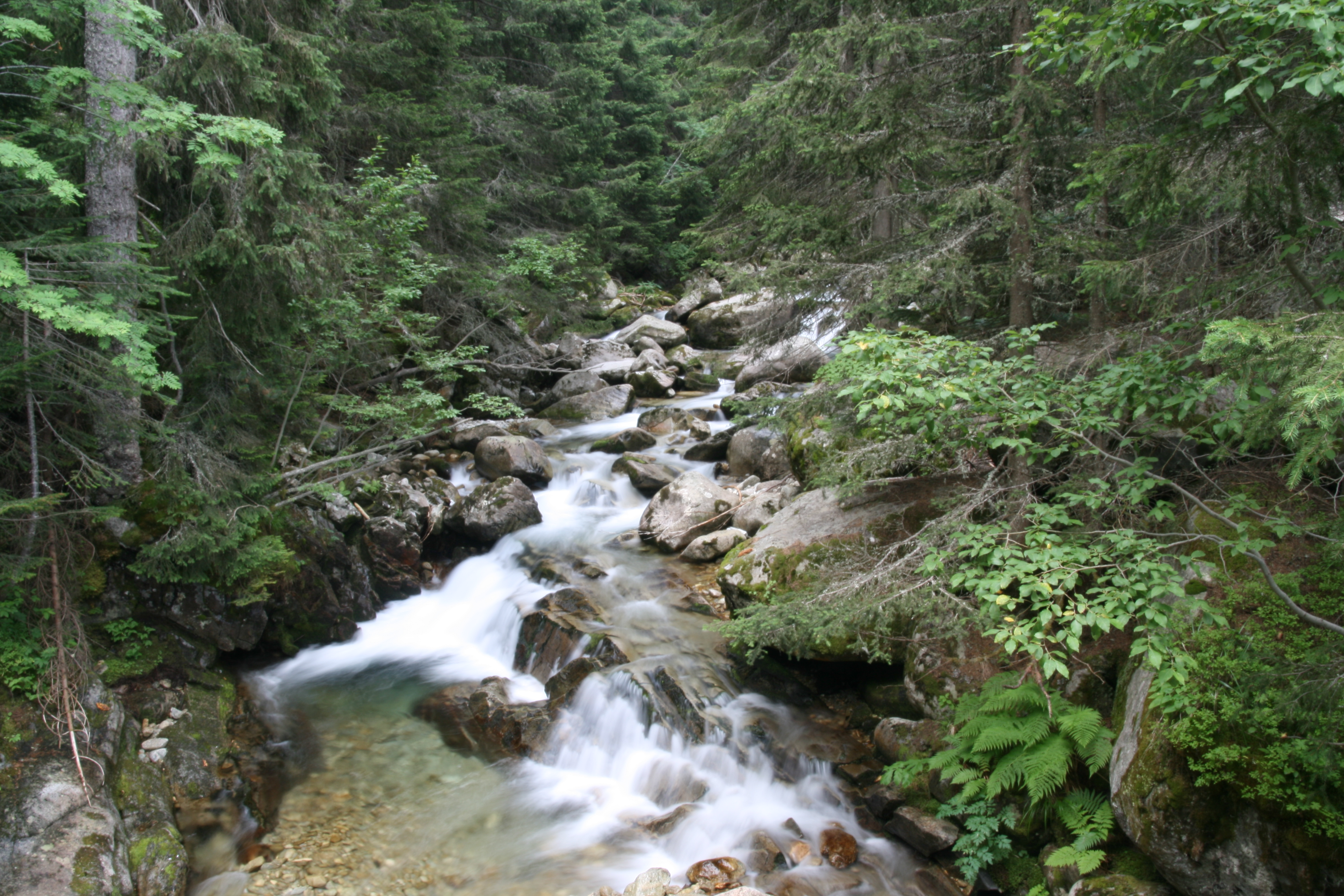

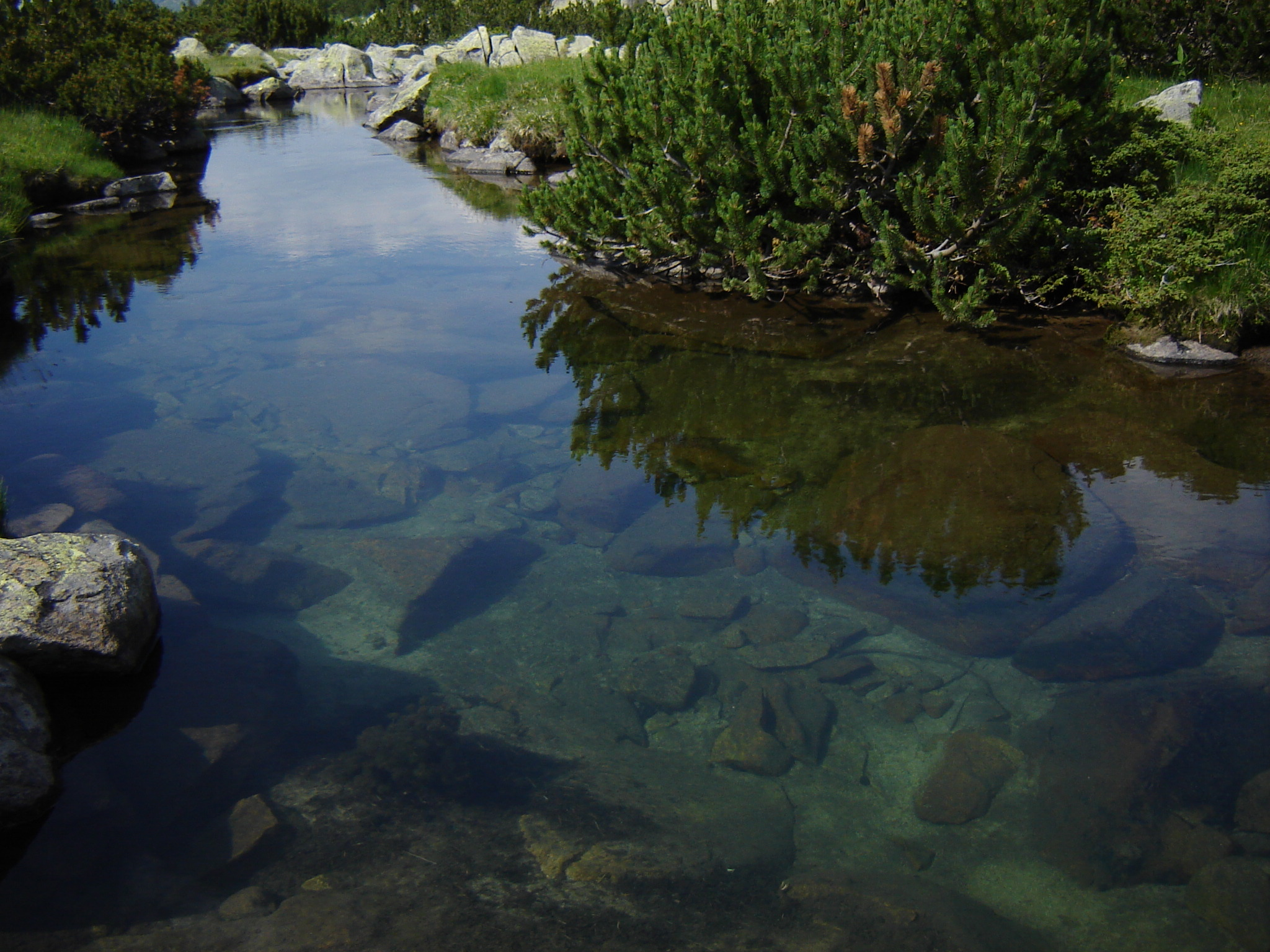

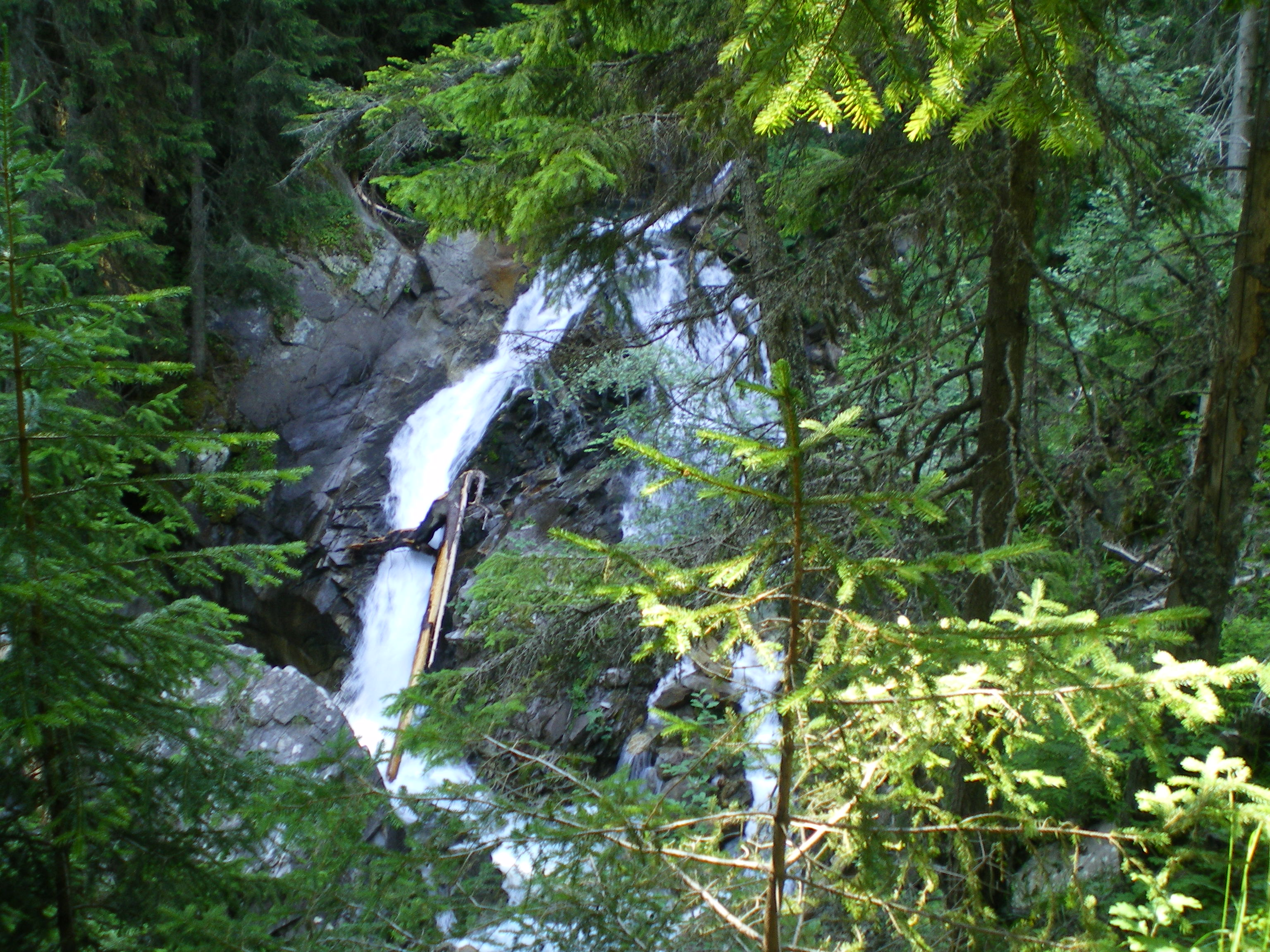
