= Glazne =

River in south-western Bulgaria

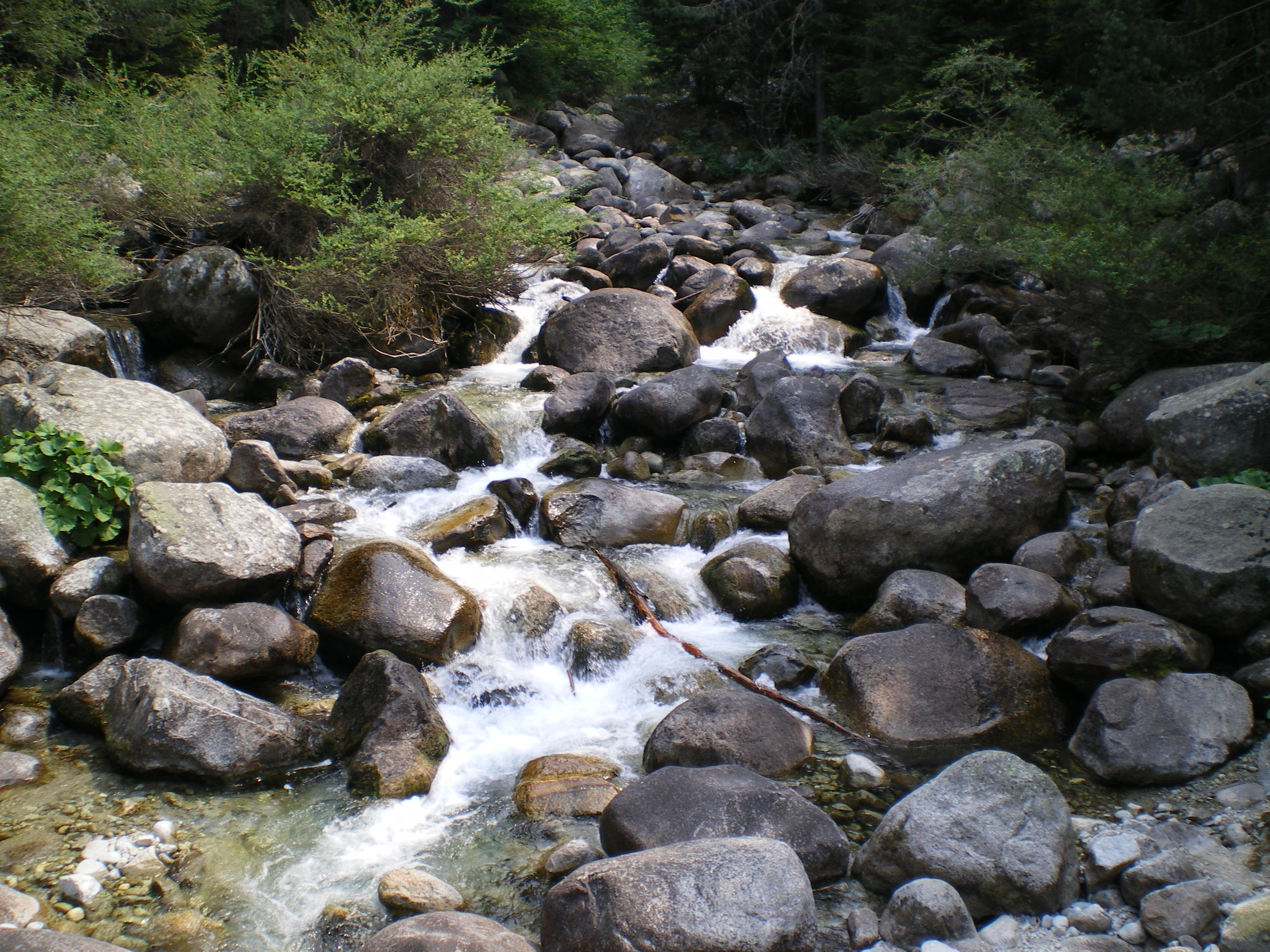

Location
- Country: Bulgaria

Physical characteristics
- Source
  - location: Confluence of Banderitsa and Demyanitsa, Pirin
  - coordinates: 41°49′1.92″N 23°28′14.16″E
  - elevation: 1,063 m (3,488 ft)
- Mouth
  - location: Iztok
  - coordinates: 41°53′42″N 23°32′25.08″E
  - elevation: 771 m (2,530 ft)
- Length: 11 km (6.8 mi)
- Basin size: 119 km^{2} (46 sq mi)

Basin features
- Progression: Iztok→ Mesta

The Glazne (Bulgarian: Глазне) is a river in south-western Bulgaria, a right tributary of the Iztok, itself a right tributary of the river Mesta. The river is 11 km long and drains parts of the northeastern slopes of the Pirin mountain range.

The river takes its source from the confluence of the rivers Banderitsa (13 km, left) and Demyanitsa (13.6 km, right) at an altitude of 1,063 m, At 400 m southwest of the town of Bansko. The main of the two tributaries is the Demyanitsa, which takes its source of the largest of the Valyavishki Lakes at an altitude of 2,280 m and flows northwards in a steep densely forested valley. Following the confluence of the Banderitsa and the Demyanitsa, the newly formed Glazne flows through the western areas of Bansko and runs through the Razlog Valley from the south to the north. To the west of the village of Banya, it turns to the northeast and flows into the river Iztok at an altitude of 771 m at 1.2 km from the village.

Its drainage basin covers a territory of 119 km^{2} or 3.89% of Mesta's total.

Glazne's flow is irregular with maximum in May-June and minimum in September. The average annual flow at Banya is 2.03 m^{3}/s, although during snowmelt the amount of water may increase to 30 m^{3}/s, the measured record being 35.8 m^{3}/s.

Its waters are used for irrigation in the Razlog Valley. The only settlement along the river is Bansko.
