= Banderitsa =

River in south-western Bulgaria

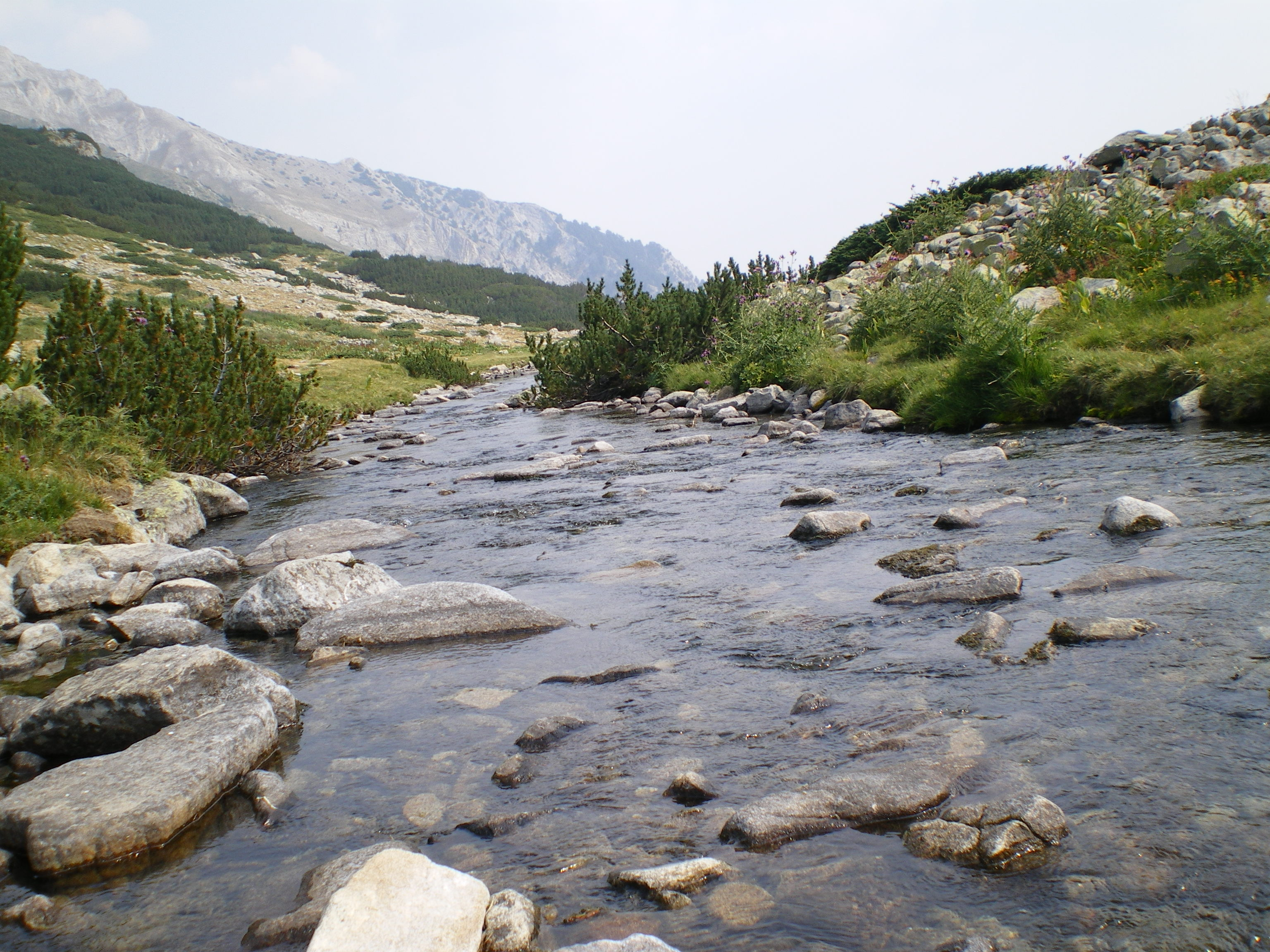

Location
- Country: Bulgaria

Physical characteristics
- Source
  - location: Banderishki Lakes, Pirin
  - coordinates: 41°44′8.16″N 23°25′24.96″E
  - elevation: 2,310 m (7,580 ft)
- Mouth
  - location: Glazne
  - coordinates: 41°49′1.92″N 23°28′14.16″E
  - elevation: 1,063 m (3,488 ft)
- Length: 13 km (8.1 mi)
- Basin size: 37 km^{2} (14 sq mi)

Basin features
- Progression: Glazne→ Iztok→ Mesta

The Banderitsa (Bulgarian: Бъндерица) is a river in south-western Bulgaria, a left tributary of the Glazne, which flows into the Iztok, itself a right tributary of the river Mesta. The river is 13 km long and drains parts of the northeastern slopes of the Pirin mountain range.

The river takes its source from the uppermost of the Banderishki Lakes, at an altitude of 2,310 m, situated in the Banderishki Cirque in northern Pirin. It initially flows to the northwest, catching the waters of the rest of lake group and the turns in northeastern direction. It flows at a high gradient of 100.77 m/km, which makes it turbulent, with many jumps and small waterfalls. The highest waterfall is Banderishki Skok, reaching 11 m at an altitude of 1,700 m. Its surroundings were declared a protected area in 1965. The Banderitsa then reaches the homonymous mountain refuge and in the next two kilometers runs through rocky and narrow valley. Upon reaching the meadow Banderishka Polyana on the foothills of the summit of Kutelo (2,908 m), the river disappears underground and reemerges after 1.5 km. At 400 m southwest of the town of Bansko at an altitude of 1,063 m, the Banderitsa merges with the river Demyanitsa, forming the river Glazne.

Its drainage basin covers a territory of 37 km^{2} or 31.09% of Glazne's total. It receives many little streams. There is a small hydro power station along the river, near Vihren refuge.

== Gallery ==
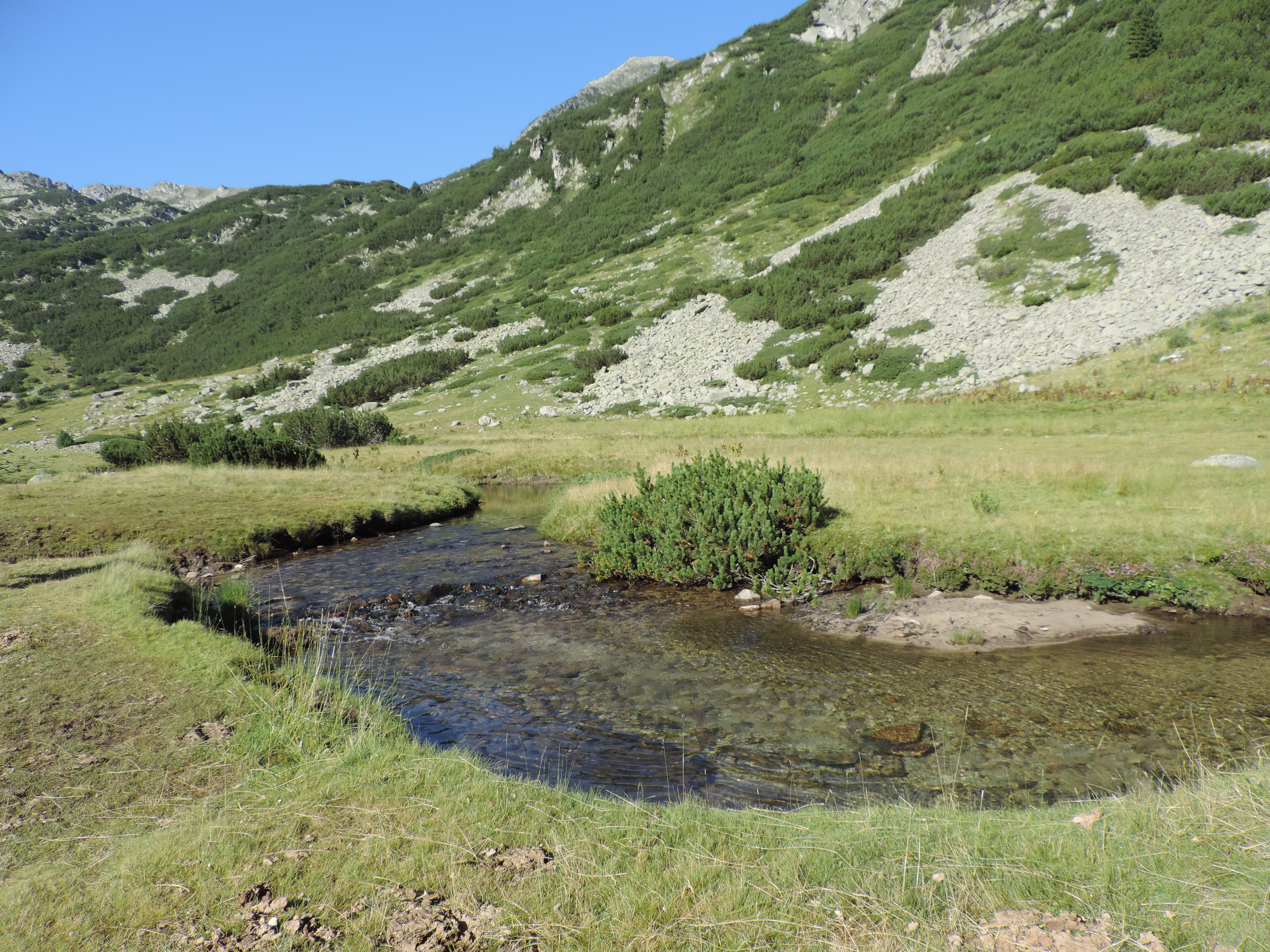

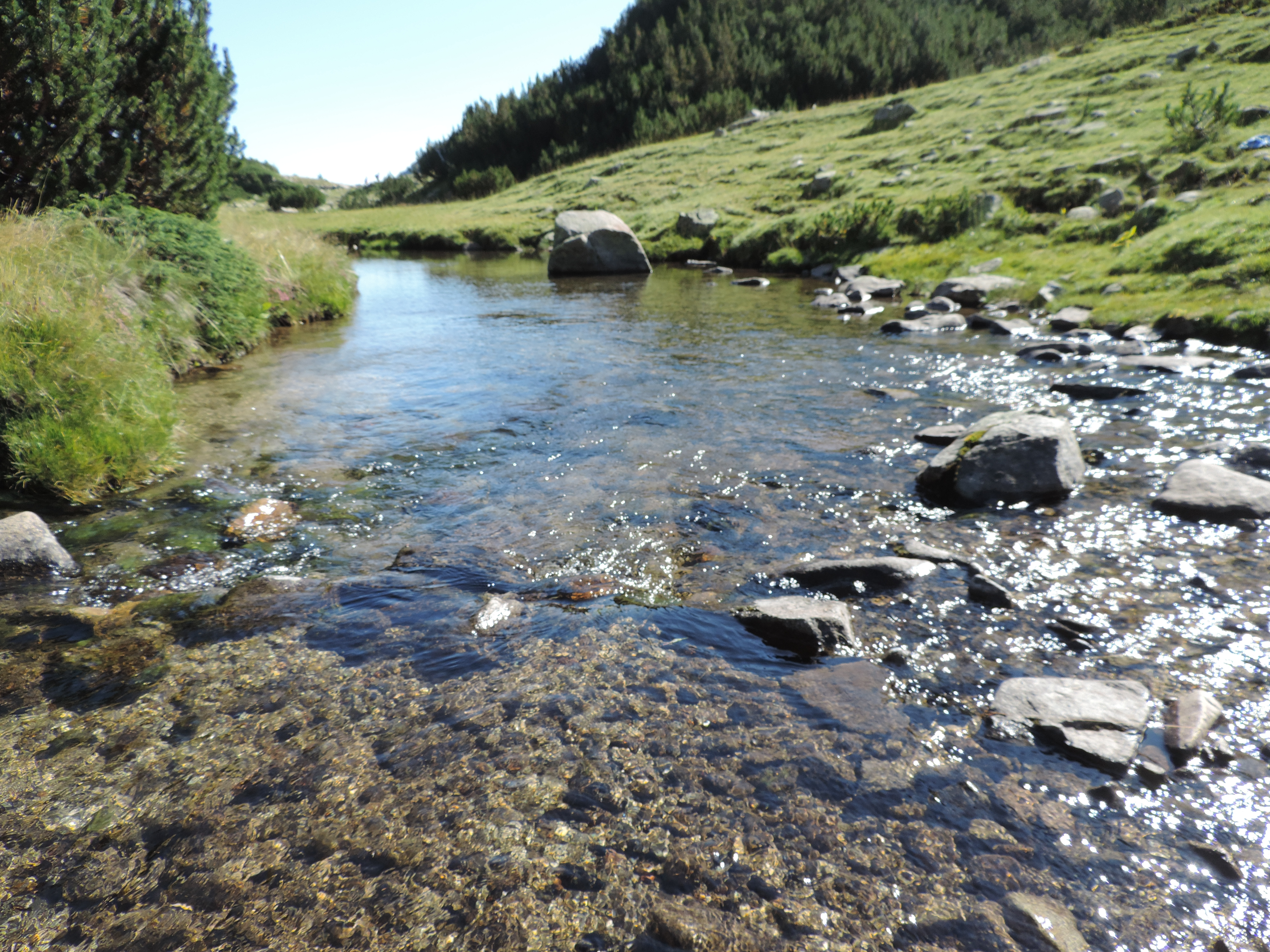

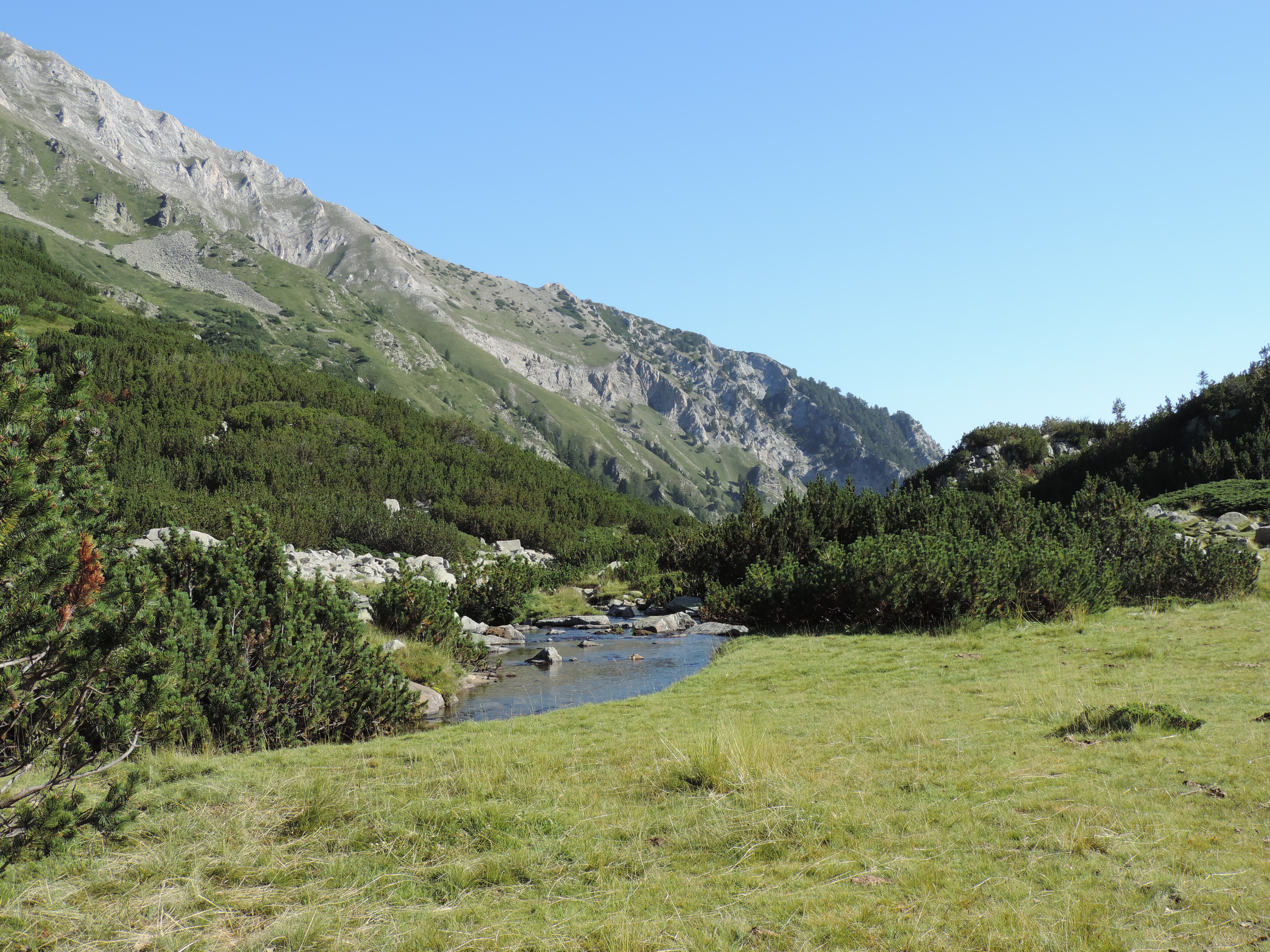

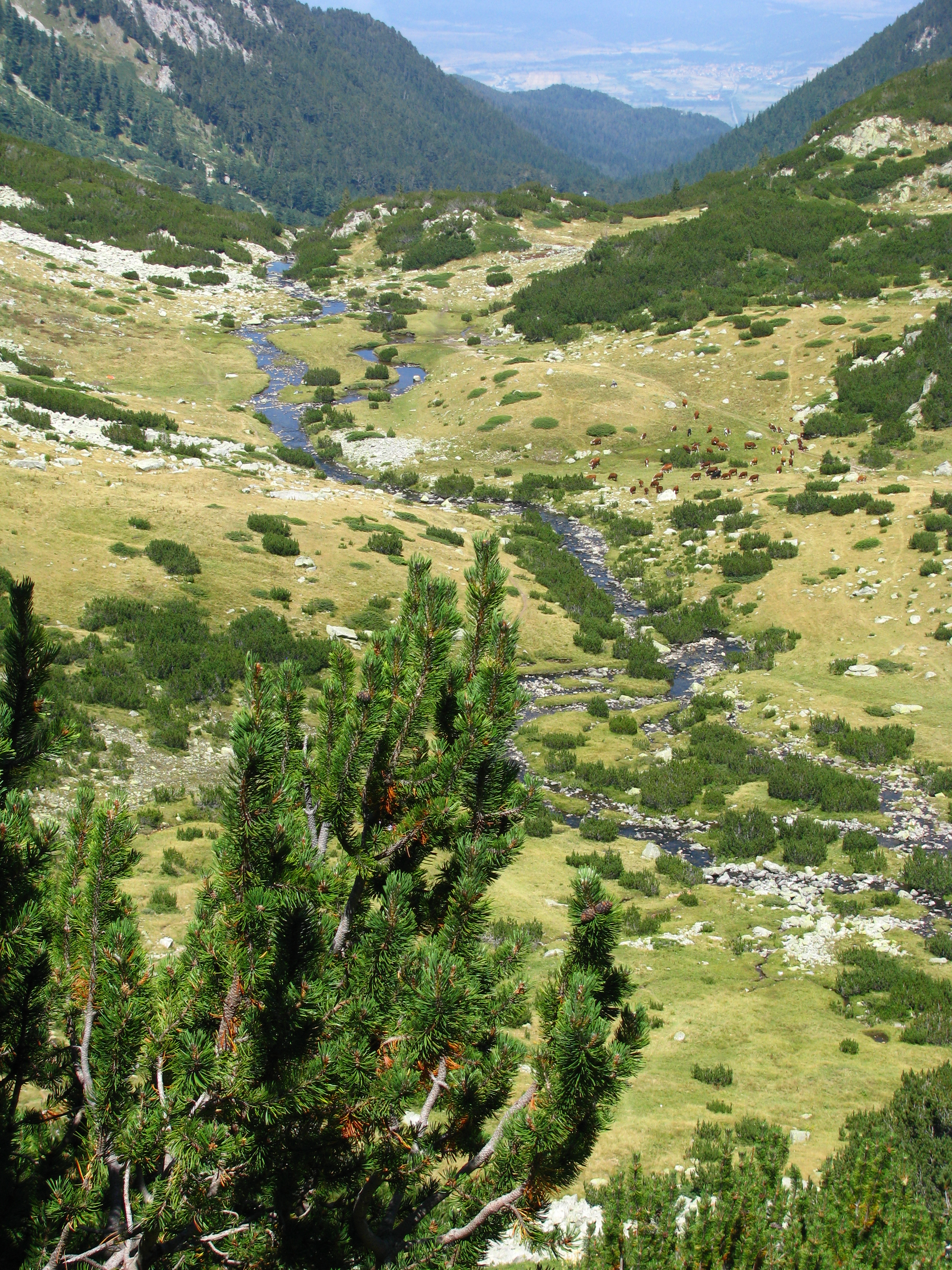
