= Trinity Church, Bansko =

Church building in Bansko, Bulgaria

Trinity Church Църква Св. Троица (in Bulgarian)
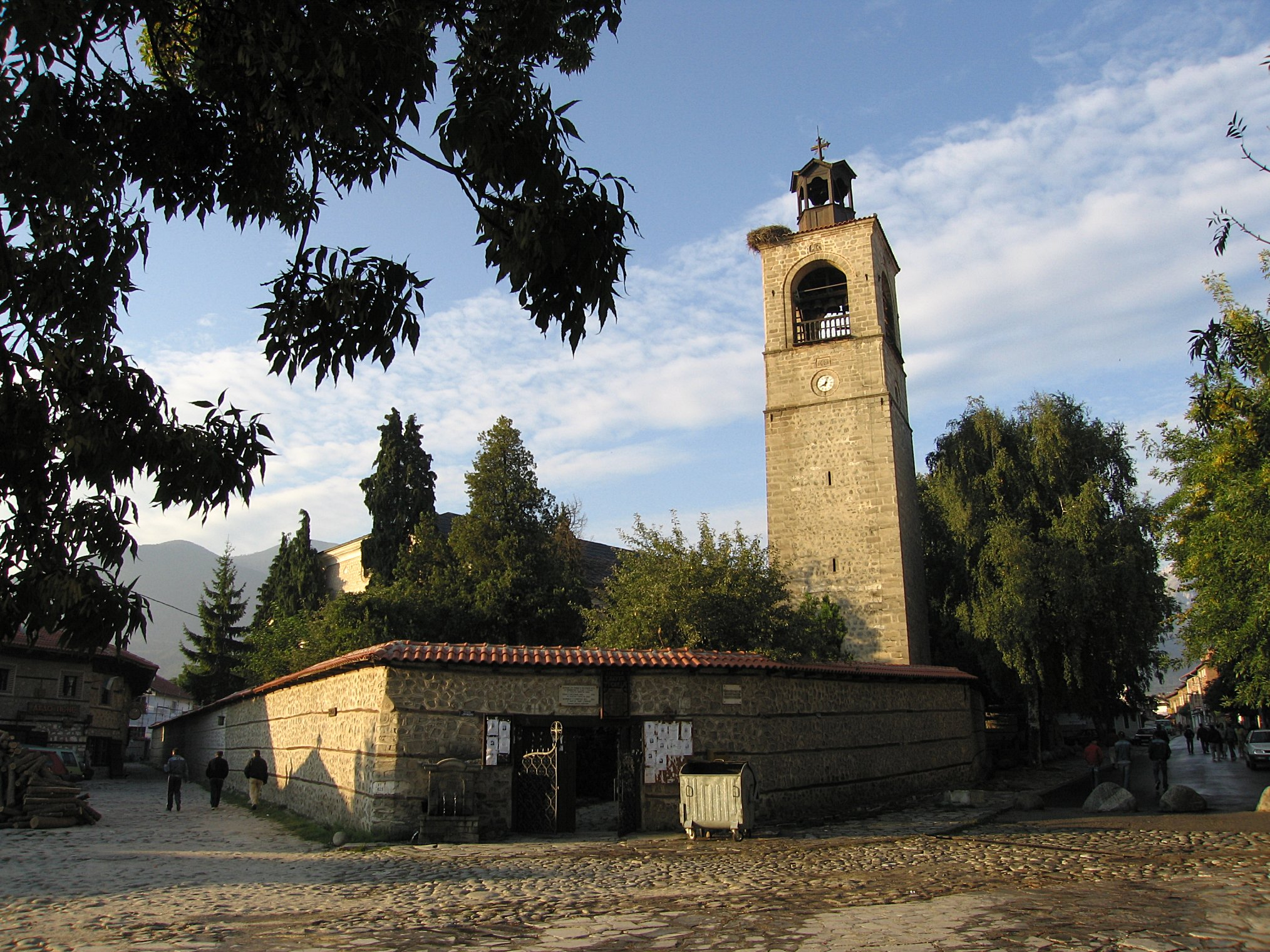

Religion
- Affiliation: Eastern Orthodox
- Province: Blagoevgrad Province
- Ecclesiastical or organisational status: Church

Location
- Location: Bansko, Bulgaria
- Interactive map of Trinity Church; Църква Св. Троица (in Bulgarian)
- Coordinates: 41°50′07″N 23°29′13″E

Architecture
- Architects: Dimitar Doyuv, Gligor Doyuv
- Style: Bulgarian National Revival
- Completed: 1835
- Height (max): 15 m

St. Trinity Church in Bansko (Bulgarian: Църква Св. Троица) is an Eastern Orthodox church building in Bansko. It is one of the finest examples of the middle and late Bulgarian National Revival church architecture.

The church does not impress with its size, but it is a national symbol of the Bulgarian Revival in its period immediately after the Bulgarian National Awakening. For several reasons.

The first from awake Bansko was a native of Paisii Hilendarski, author of Istoriya Slavyanobolgarskaya. Second from Bansko is Neofit Rilski. And third, as awake and wealthy residents of Bansko want to be in charge during the Bulgarian Revival, so the construction of this church coincides with the preparation of the Bulgarian Conspiracy of 1835.

On 5 October 1912, in the yard of the gathered inhabitants of Bansko, the voivode Peyo Yavorov uttered the sacred words in expression of the freedom of the Bulgarians — Brothers, throw away the fezzes! From today you are already free Bulgarians! Bansko is already a Bulgarian city, not one of the rotten Ottoman Empire during the Balkan War. In addition, the most hated symbol of tyranny and despotism for Bulgarians is fez, symbolizing the Auspicious Incident.

== Gallery ==
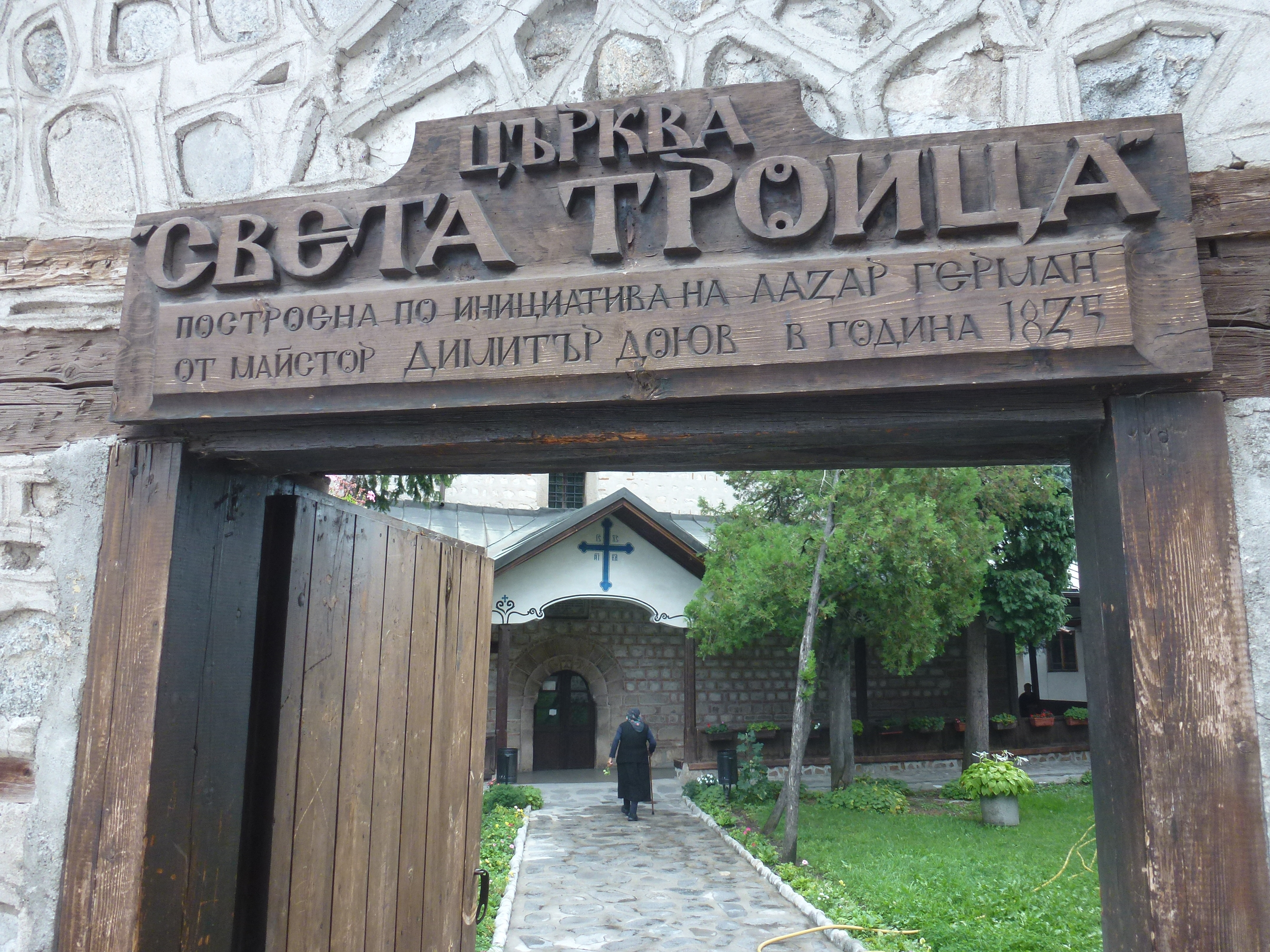

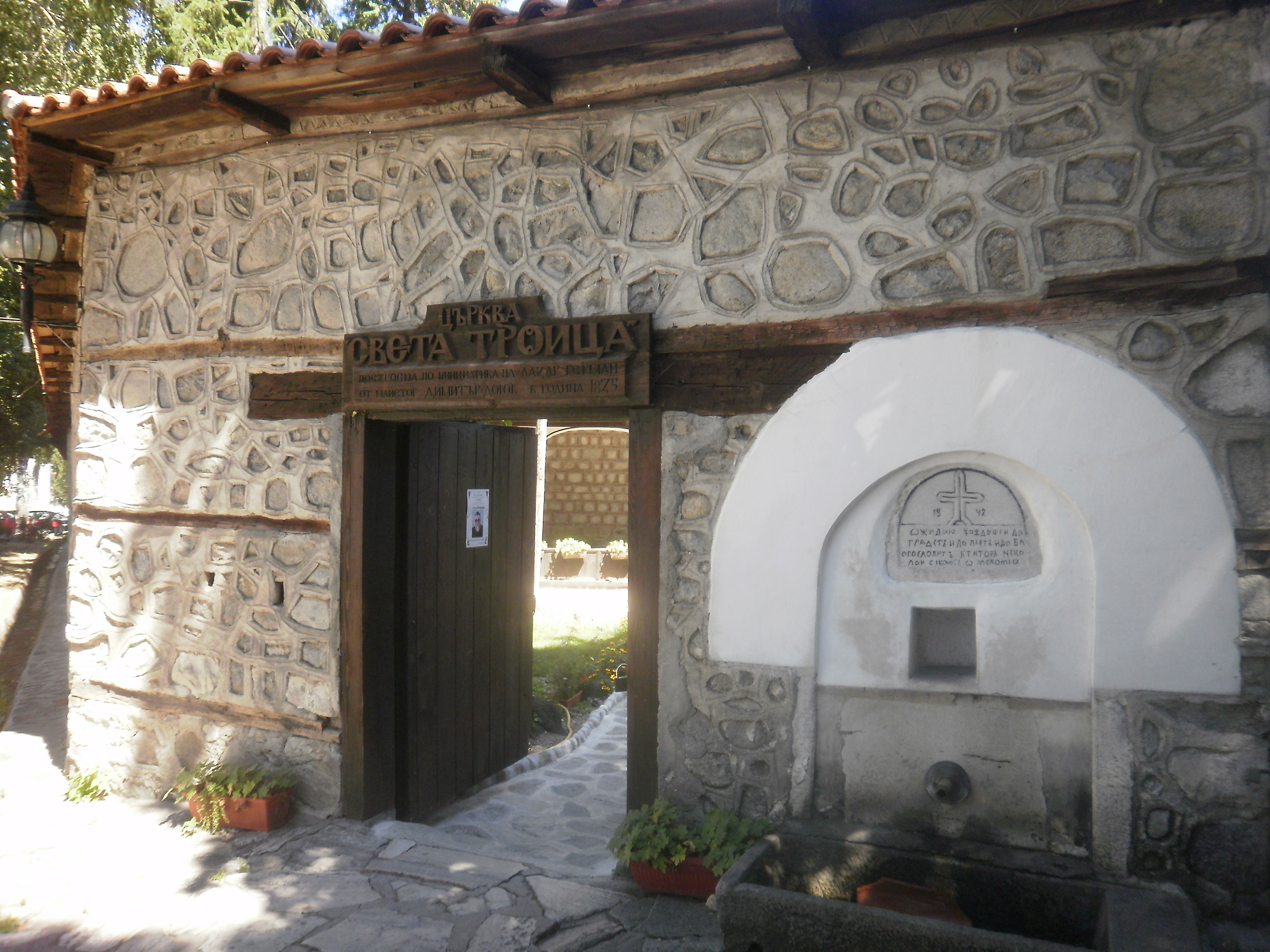

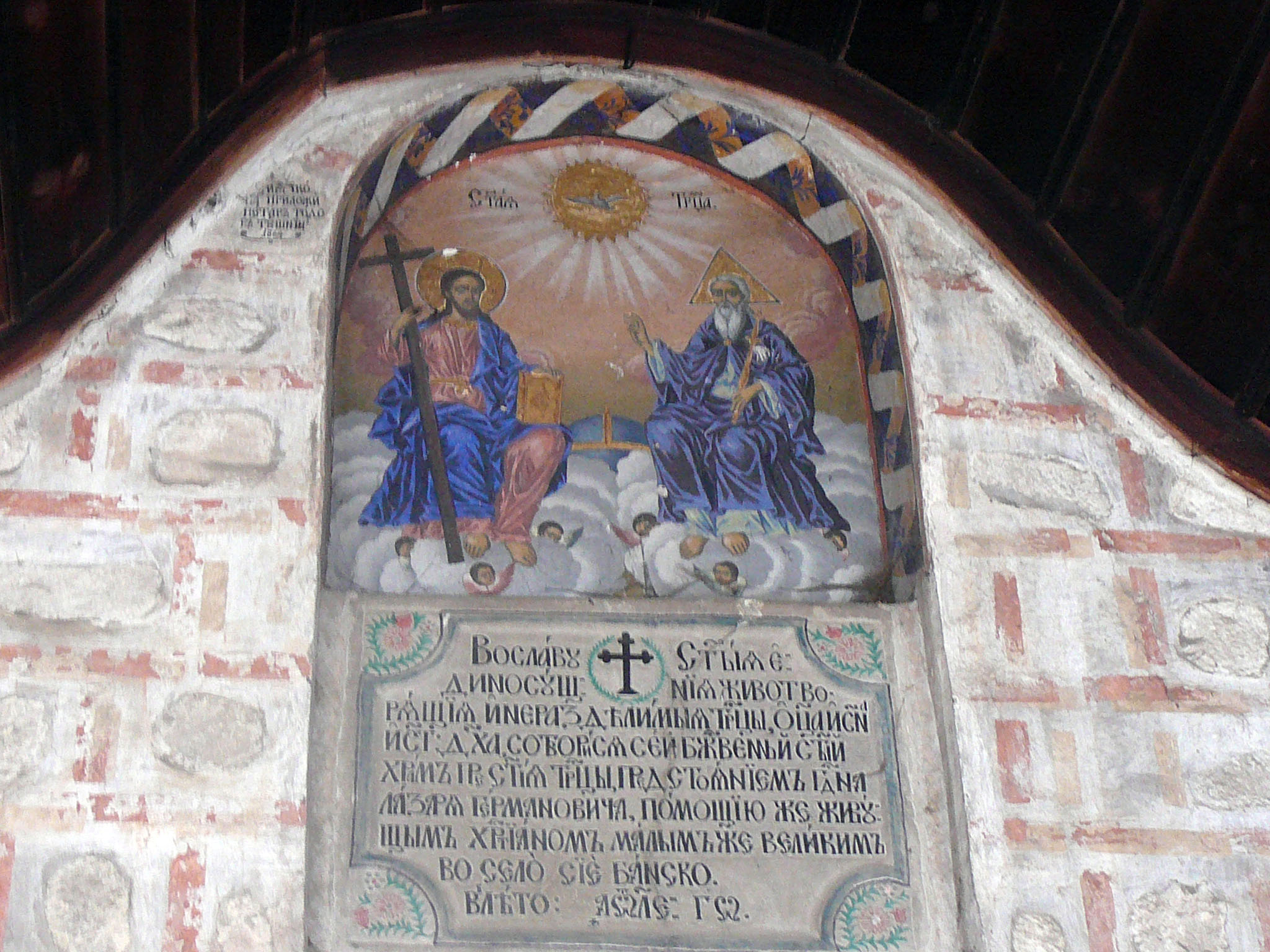

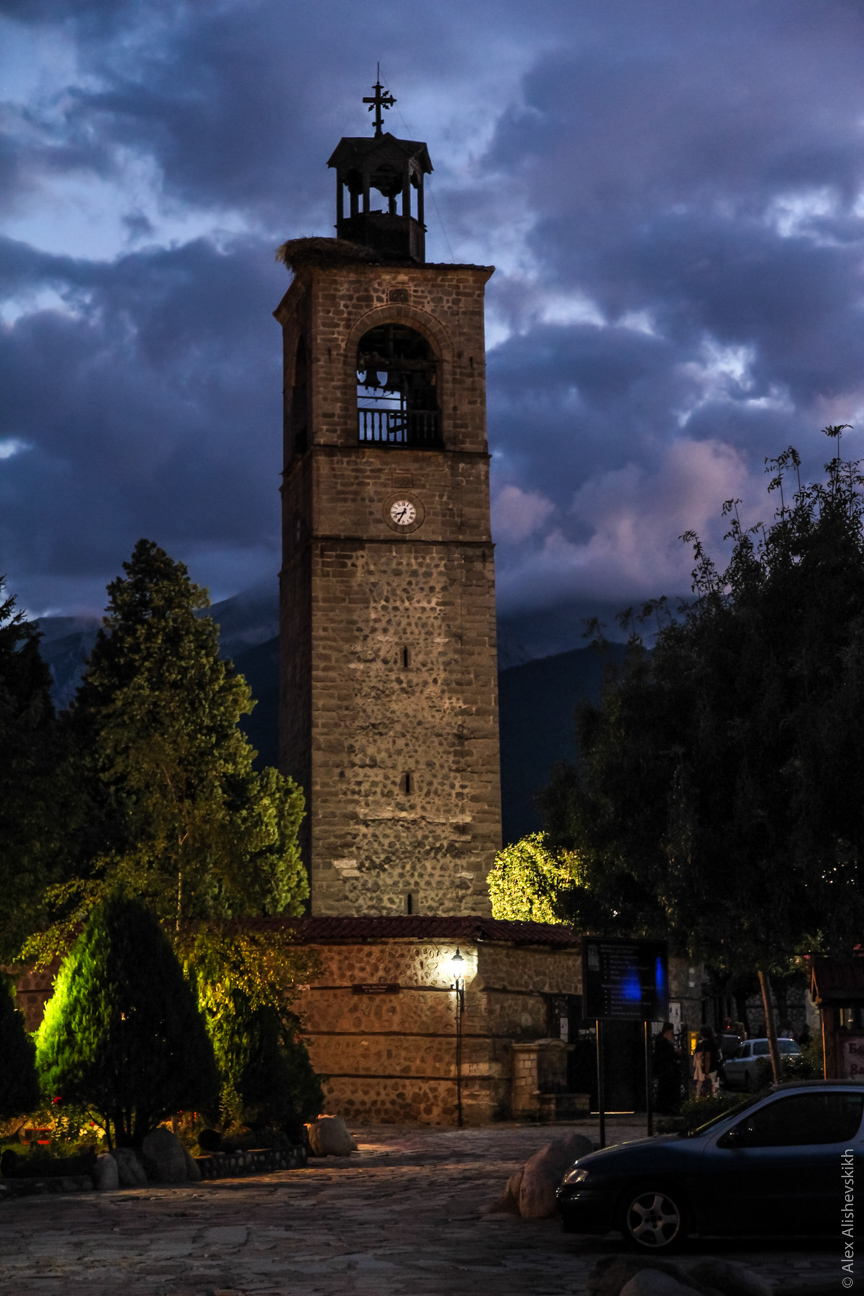

== See also ==
- Phrygian cap
- Samara flag
- Liberation of Bulgaria
