= Todorka =

Summit in Blagoevgrad Province, Bulgaria

Todorka (Тодорка)
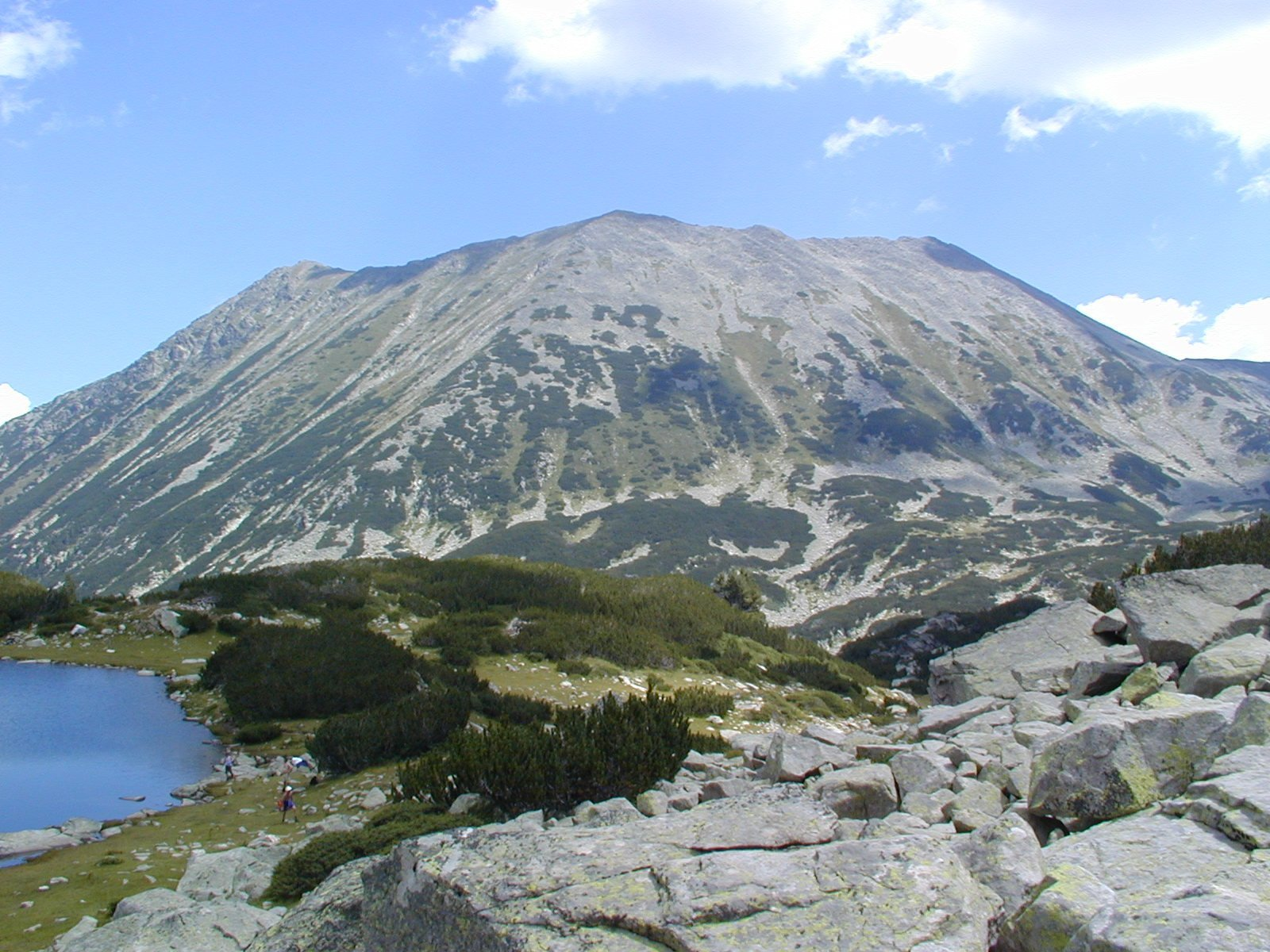
- Todorka with its three peaks. From left: Golyama (Big) Todorka, Sredna (Middle) Todorka and Malka (Little) Todorka.

Highest point
- Elevation: 2,746 m (9,009 ft)
- Coordinates: 41°45′09.8″N 23°25′54.4″E

Geography
- Location within Bulgaria
- Location: Blagoevgrad Province, Bulgaria
- Parent range: Pirin Mountains

Todorka (Bulgarian: Тодорка [toˈdɔrkɐ]) is a massive peak in the Pirin Mountains of south-western Bulgaria. It is the only peak of the Todorka side ridge and has a summit elevation of 2746 m (9009 ft.) above sea level. Todorka is the 11th highest peak in Pirin and is made of granite, and although not rocky, it is steep. It is a relatively short crest with three peaks - Golyama (Big), Sredna (Middle) and Malka (Little) Todorka. Golyama Todorka is located to the north and viewed from the town of Bansko looks like a dramatic pyramid. There are several ski tracks from its slopes, and it has been developed extensively since 2000 and is now a major ski area, with a lift-served summit of 2600 m (8530 ft). Bansko hosted World Cup races for the women in 2009 and for the men in 2011.

Following the ridge to the southwest of Golyama Todorka is Sredna Todorka at 2706 m (8878 ft.) and to the southeast is Malka Todorka (2712 m, 8898 ft.). To the east of the cirque their form are situated the two lakes Todorini Ochi (Todora's eyes) which are part of the Vasilashki Lakes near which runs the route between the Vihren refuge and Demyanitsa refuge. To the west is the Banderitsa valley which makes a peculiar twist following the twist of the Todorka peak. That is the reason why the end of the valley lies invisible from Bansko.

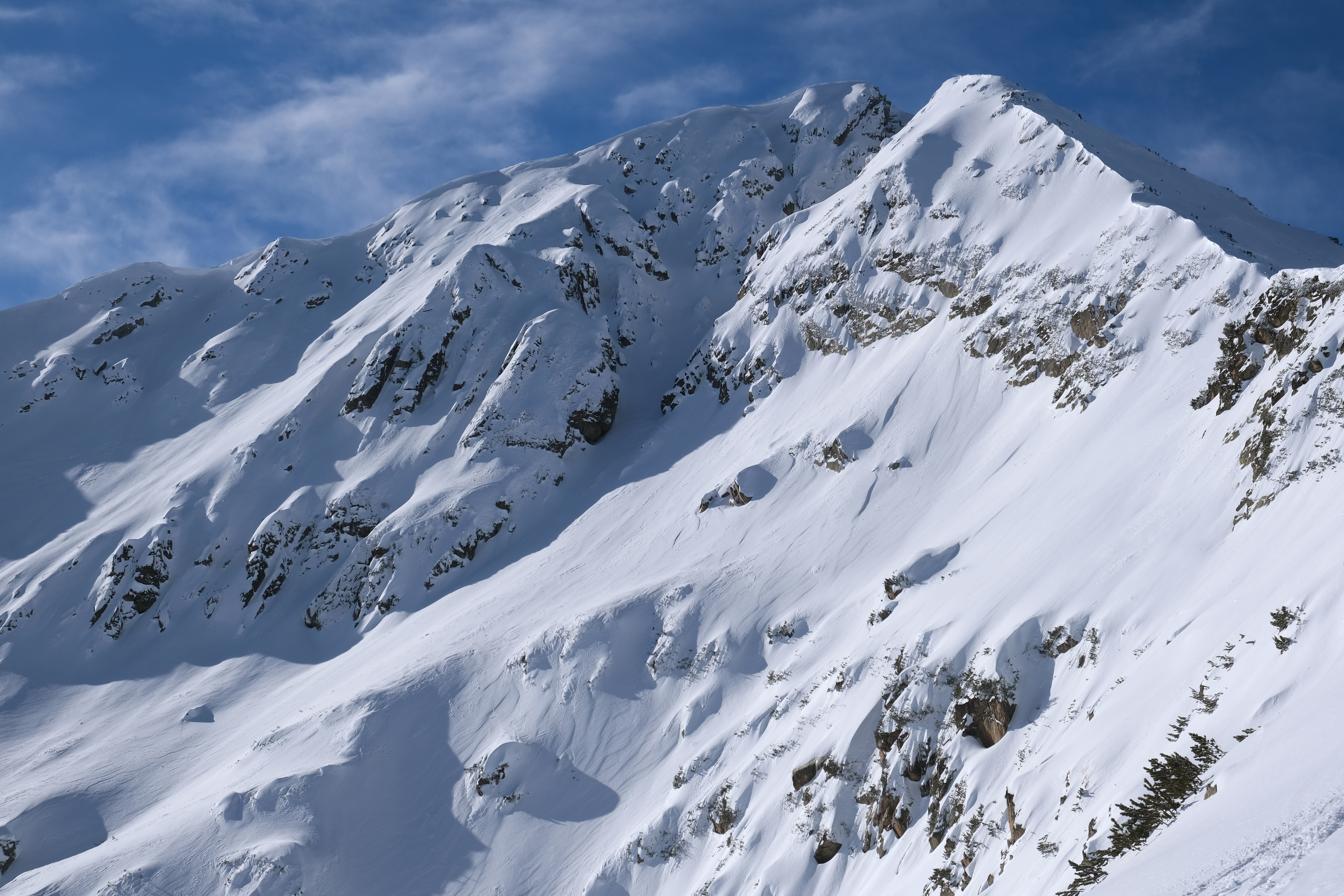
Todorka peak.

There is an impressive panorama from the peak. To the west can be seen Vihren and Kutelo, to the east is the Strazhite edge. To the south Kamenitsa rises above the other peaks. To the north in cloudless days there is a dramatic view to Bansko in which the streets and buildings are clearly visible.

== Legends ==
There are two legends about the name of the peak. The first one tells about the brave Bulgarian woman Todorka who the defended the Sinan fortress against the Turks during the Bulgarian-Ottoman Wars. She fought to the end and finally ran to the peak above the castle chased by the Turks, jumped into the abyss and died. According to the second legend a local girl named Todorka did not manage to persuade her father to marry to her beloved Vasil. She ran away from home, reached the peak and started to cry from which the two lakes Todorini Ochi were formed. Vasil searched for her in vain and in the end reached the nearby peak Vasilashki Chukar and threw himself in despair into the lake below (one of the Vasilashki Lakes).
