= Vasilashki Lakes =

Lakes in Bulgaria

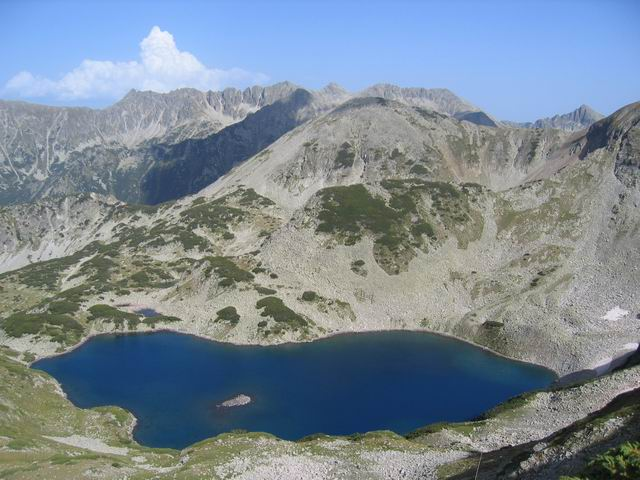
The Tevno Vasilashko Lake.

The Vasilashki Lakes (Bulgarian: Василашки езера) are situated in Pirin, Bulgaria in a large cirque between the Todorka and Vasilashki Chukar peaks. The cirque is opened to the east, where it faces the Demyanitsa river in which the water of the lakes pour. This cirque also includes the two lakes Todorini Ochi (Todora's Eyes), whose waters goes to one of the Vasilaski lakes. The cirque is amphitheatric and in fact consists of several smaller cirques situated in a fan-shape way above the main one, in which the two largest lakes are located. The lakes are 10 including the two Todorini, with a total surface area of 160 decares. Their name derives from the legent for Vasil, the beloved one of Todorka, who plunged into the Fish Vasilashko lake when she broke his heart. The most important lakes are:

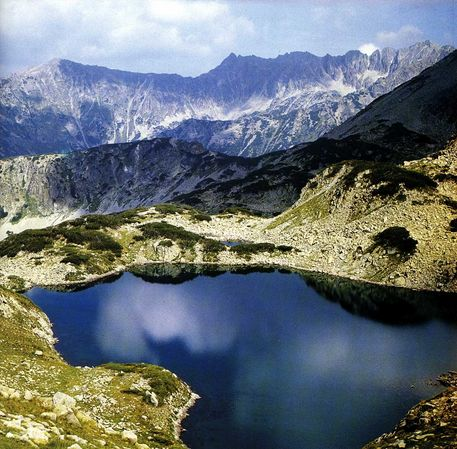
The Upper Vasilashko Lake.

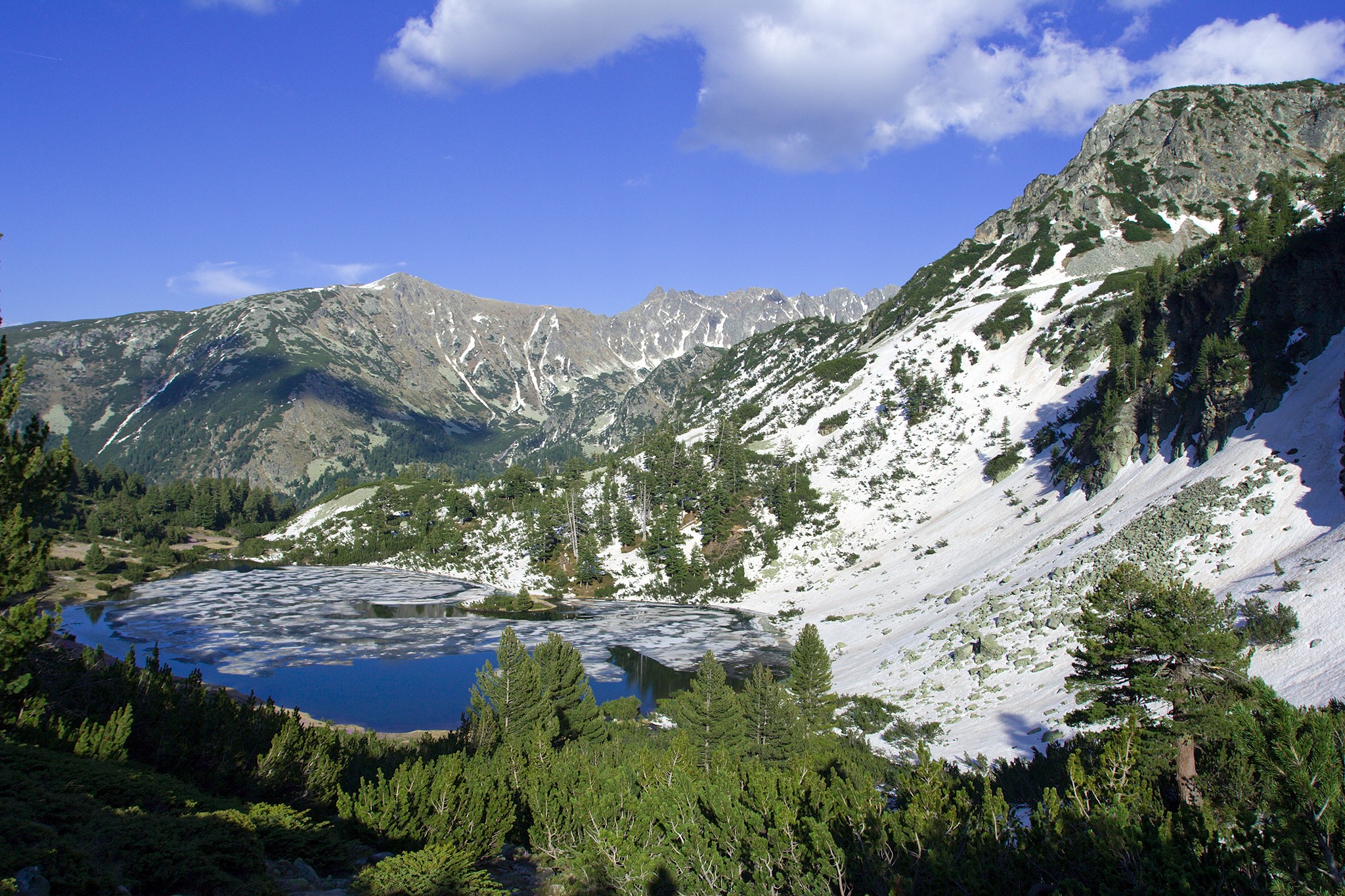
The Lower Vasilashko Lake.

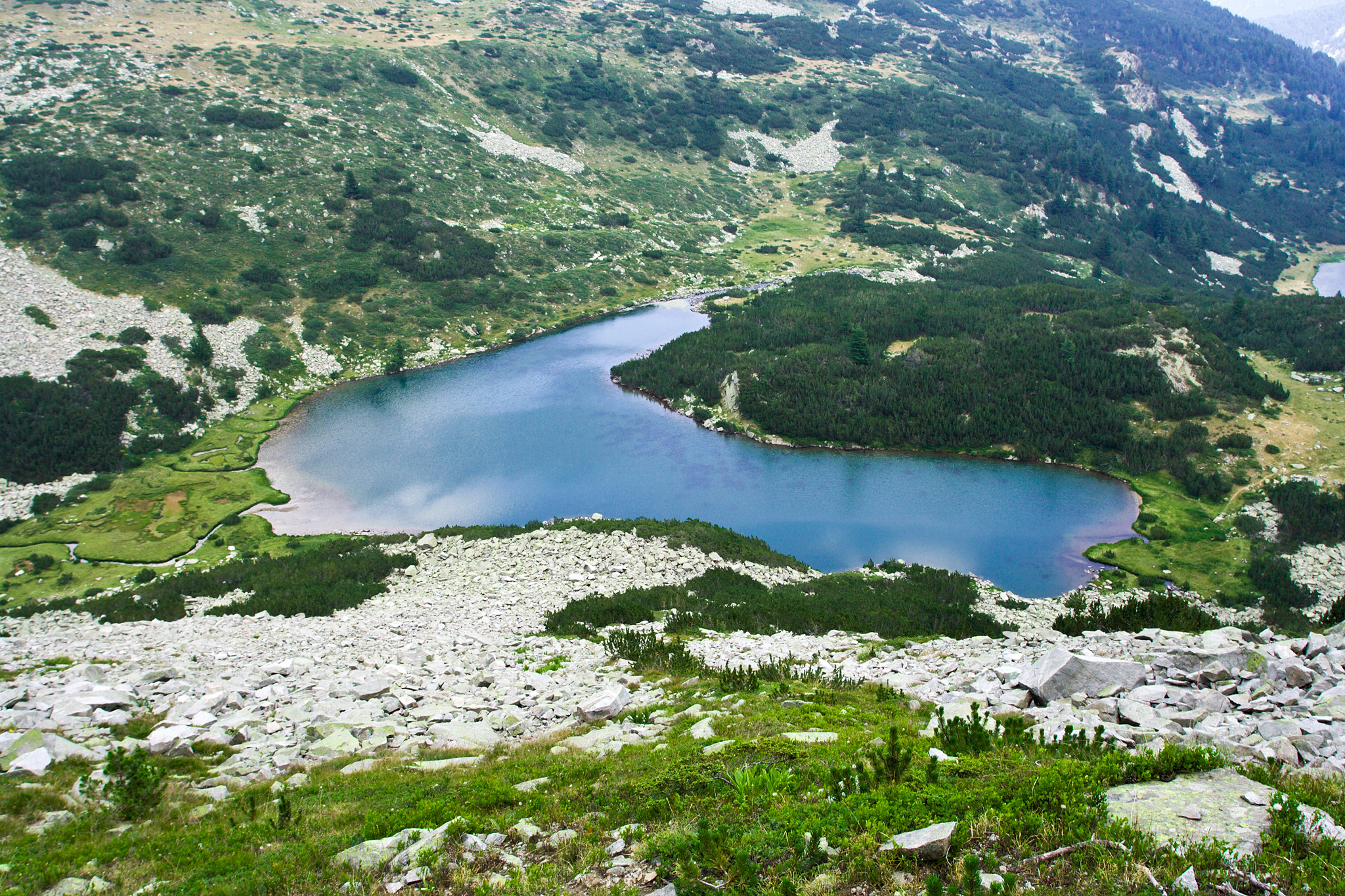
The Upper Vasilashko Lake.

- The Tevno Vasilashko Lake (Bulgarian: Тевното Василашко езеро), called also the Blue Lake is one of the largest and deepest lakes in the mountain, and is first by these indicators in the group. It is situated at an altitude of 2,362 m; its size is 63.9 decares (388x215 m) which makes it sixth in Pirin; and is 29 m deep which makes it second after the Popovo Lake with only half metre more. The water volume of 510,000 m³ is also considerable and is third in Pirin. The lake has exceptional beauty, saturated blue waters and a tiny islet in the middle. The water pours out in the Upper Vasilashko Lake by means of underground stream, which makes it impossible for the fish to reach it.
- The Fish Vasilashko Lake (Bulgarian: Рибното Василашко езеро), sometimes referred as the Big Vasilashko Lake, is second in size (35.9 decares) and is situated slightly below the Upper Lake at 2,126 m. It is 325 m long and 177 m wide with maximum depth of 2.5 m, which explains its small volume-only 41,000 m³. A small picturesque peninsular juts out in its southern part. The lake gathers the water of the whole cirque. At first, it forms an underground river under the ridge but at a distance of 250 m the waters appear on the surface and sweeps down the slopes. The lake teems with trout, which has eventually given its name.
- The Upper Vasilashko Lake (Bulgarian: Горно Василашко езеро) is situated at 2,154 m under the Tipits Peak. Its shape resembles that of a boomerang (212x235 m) and has area of 23.2 decares. It is not very deep: only 3.1 m and the volume is 29,000 m³. It is also the place where the water from the Todora's Eyes and Tevnoto Lake pour in.
- The Rainbow-shaped Vasilashko Lake (Bulgarian: Дъговидното Василшко езеро) is situated in a separate small cirque under the Tipits Peak at 2,215 m. With depth of 10.4 m, it is second in the group and ninth in Pirin. It is not very large: its surface is only 10.9 decares (165x106 m). The lake has a shape of an irregular pentagonal, whose eastern side is curved as a rainbow. Its water pour into the Fish Lake under the ground.
- The Upper Todorino Lake (Bulgarian: Горно Тодорино езеро) is the larger of the two lakes of the same name. Situated at 2,536 m it is among of the highest in Pirin (fifth). This is why it is surrounded by morains not with bush. The surface area is 13.2 decares; the depth is 7.7 m and the volume is 44,600 m³. It is almost perfectly round with size of 124x151 m. The two lakes are also famous as the Todora's Eyes to remember the maiden Todorka who bewailed her beloved Vasil and her tears created the lakes.
- The Lower Todorino Lake (Bulgarian: Долно Тодорино езеро) is located at 2,510 m which makes it one of the ten highest lakes in Pirin. Its surface area is 6.7 decares; the depth 3.7 m and the volume is 12,000 m³. It is also almost round: 110x82 m.
