= Iztok (river) =

River in south-western Bulgaria

Coordinates: 41°54′N 23°34′E

Location
- Country: Bulgaria

Physical characteristics
- Mouth
  - location: Mesta River
- Length: 16.5 km (10.3 mi)

Basin features
- Progression: Nestos→ Aegean Sea

The Iztok (Bulgarian: Изток) is a river in south-western Bulgaria, a right tributary of the Mesta. The river is 16.5 km long and drains part of the northeastern sections of the Pirin mountain range. The Iztok takes its source from the Izvoro karst spring in the northern slopes of Pirin.

In its upper course, the river flows to the northeast and receives the tributaries of Rakovitsa on the right and Valevichka reka on the left. In the eastern suburbs of the town of Razlog, the Iztok receives its left tributaries Yazo and Bela Rreka, and turns to the southeast. Shortly before its confluence with the Mesta near the village of Banya, it receives its final tributaries, the Sedruch and Draglishka reka on left and the Glazne on the right.
