= Banya, Blagoevgrad Province =

Banya
- Village
- Seal

- Location within Bulgaria
- Coordinates: 41°52′52″N 23°31′28″E
- Country: Bulgaria
- Province: Blagoevgrad Province
- Municipality: Razlog
- Time zone: UTC+2 (EET)
  - Summer (DST): UTC+3 (EEST)

Banya is a village in Razlog Municipality, in Blagoevgrad Province, Bulgaria, laying 4 km to the east of the town of Razlog and at about the same distance to the north of the ski resort of Bansko.

Banya was first settled by the Thracians around the 4th century BC because of its thermal springs. Its mineral waters source at temperature ranging between 37 and 57 degrees Celsius are used for spa, recreational and industrial purposes. It is currently being developed into a spa and mountain resort with new hotels, restaurants and other tourist facilities emerging each season.
