= Bansko =

Bansko Банско (Bulgarian)
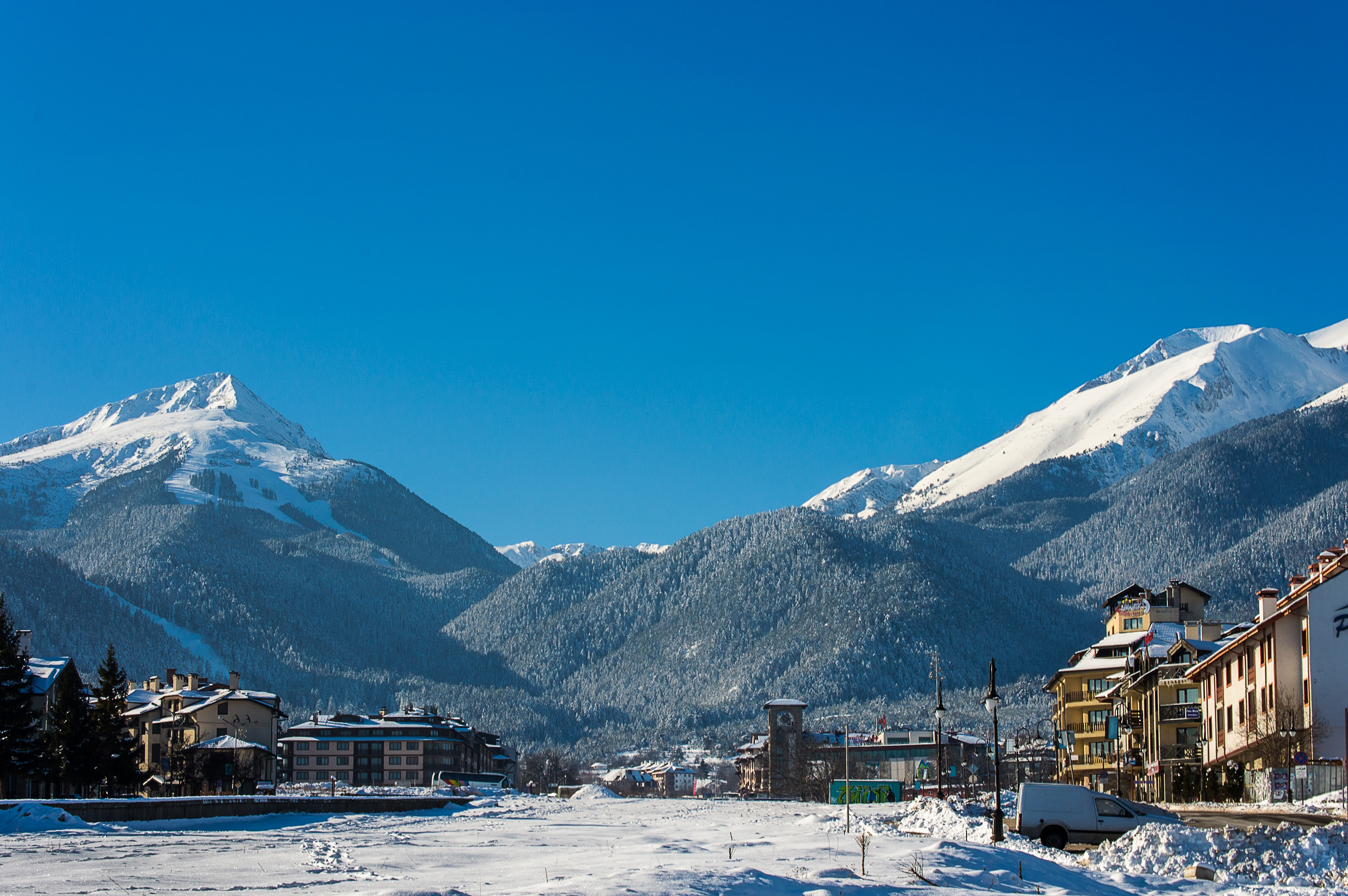
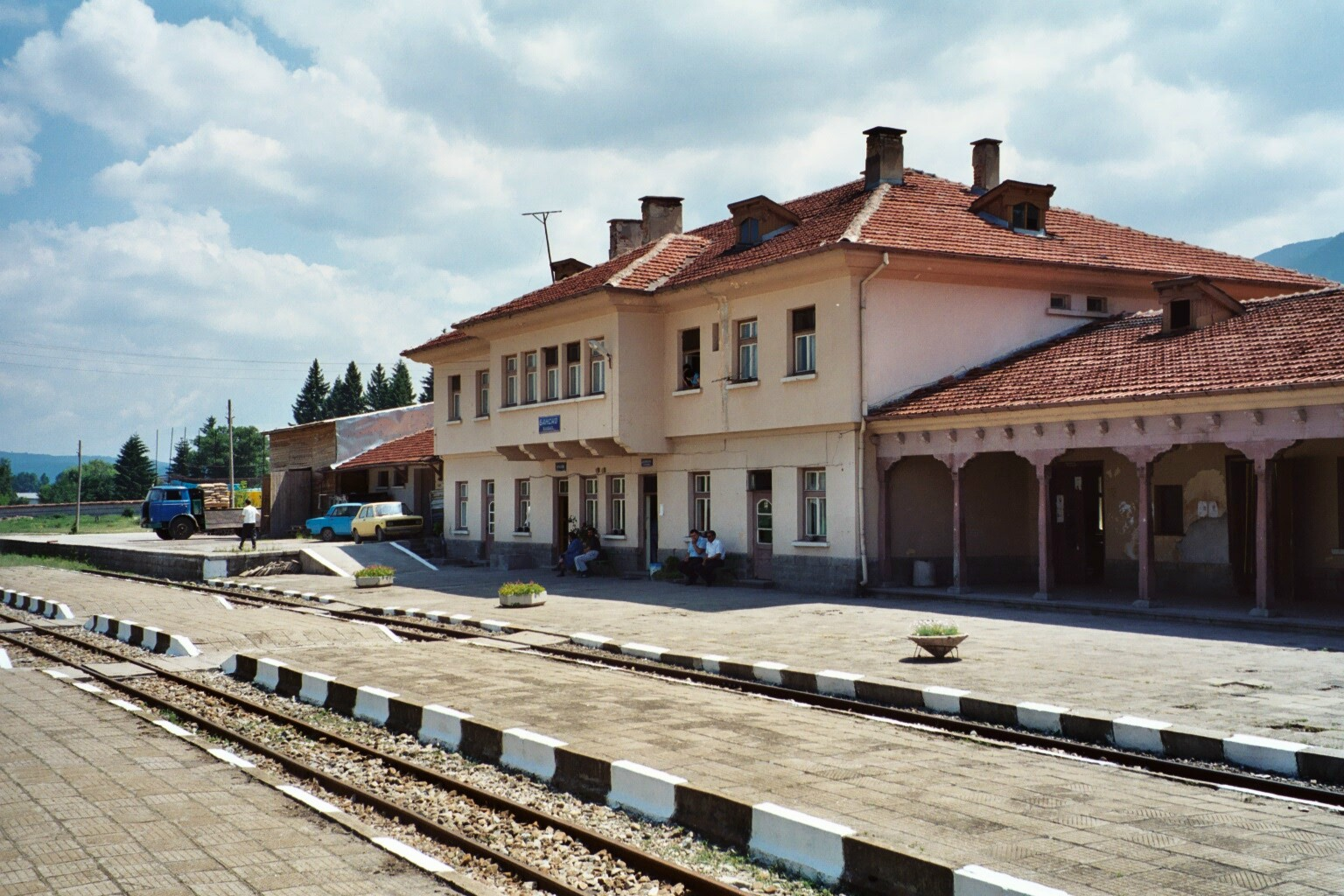
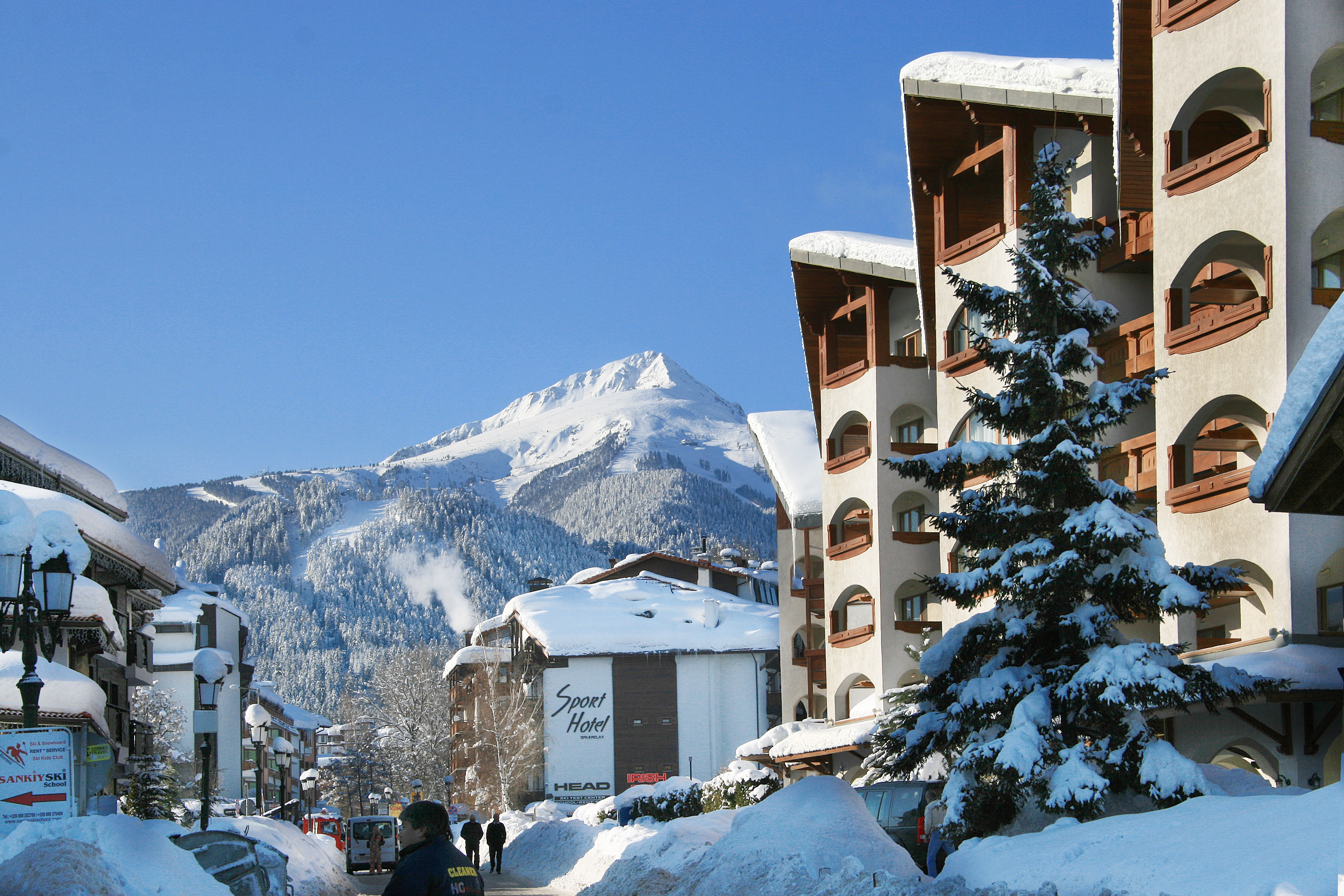
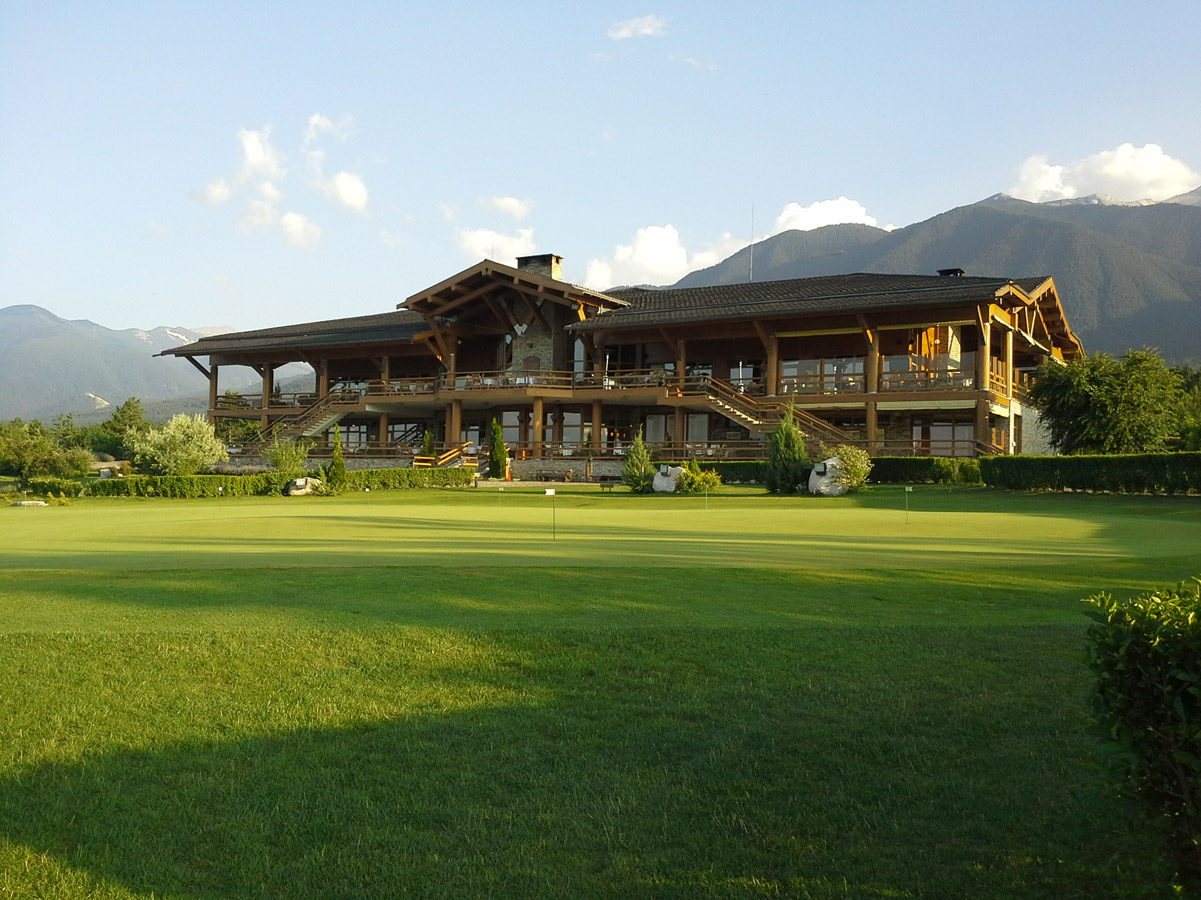
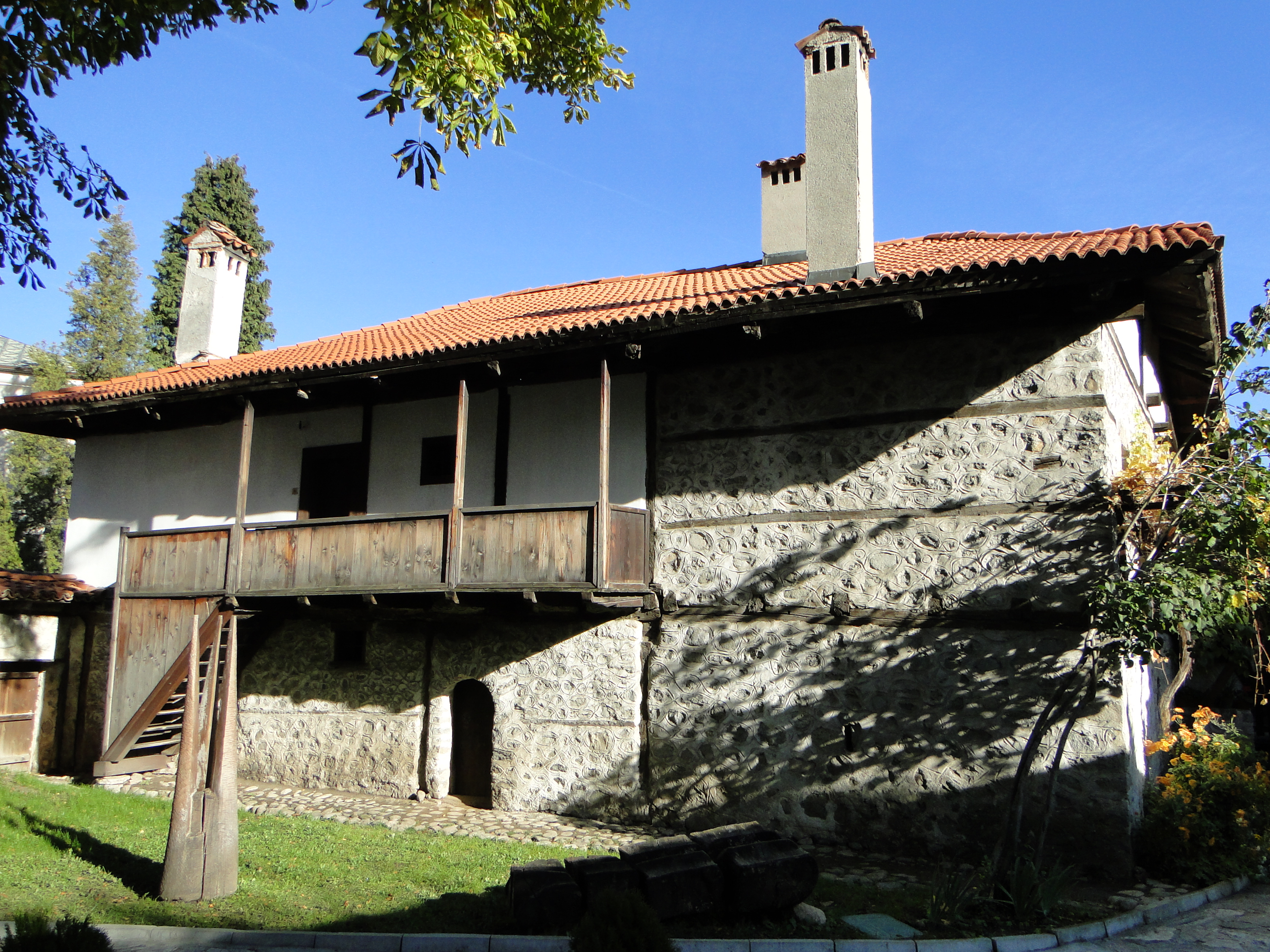
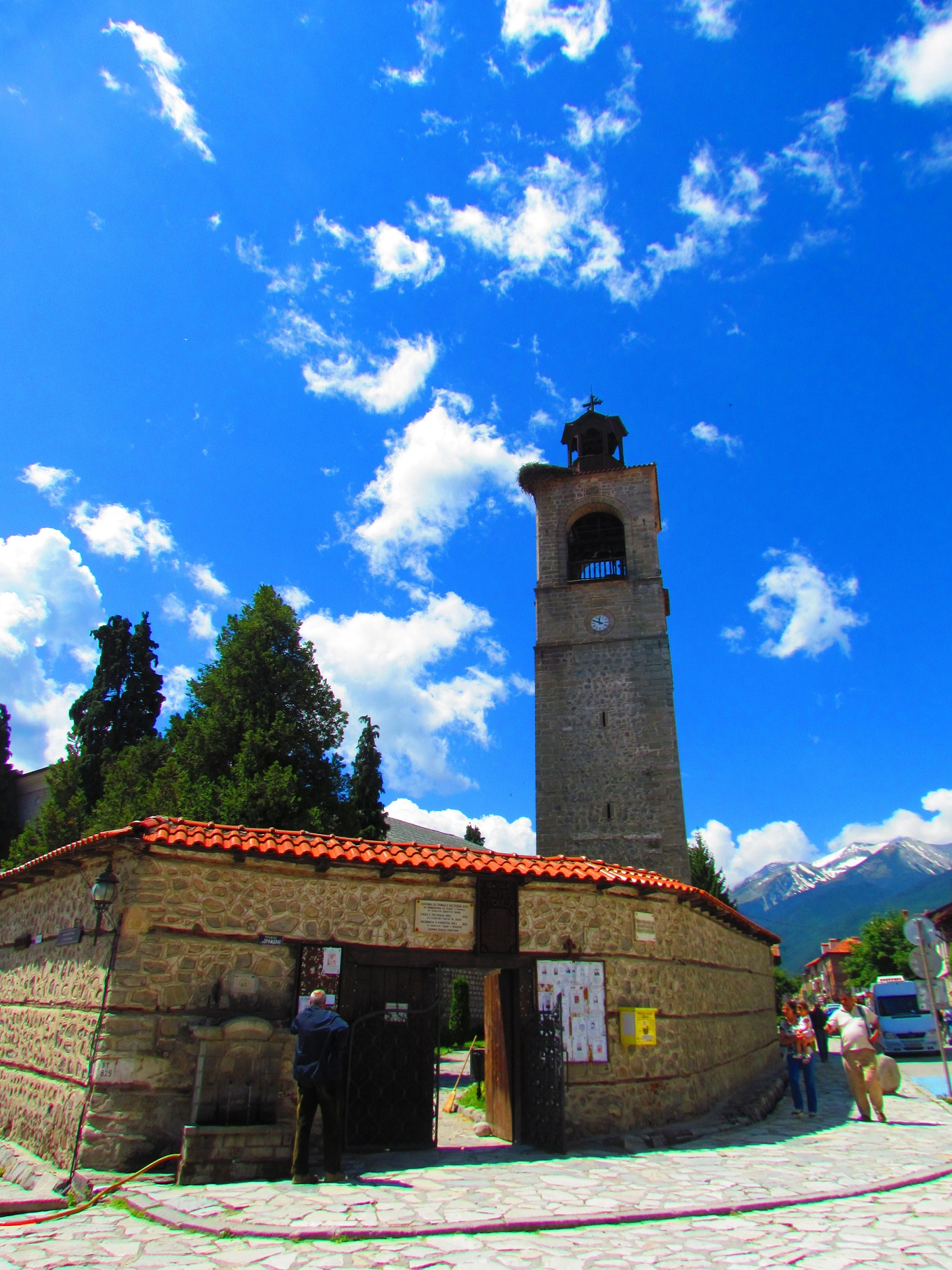
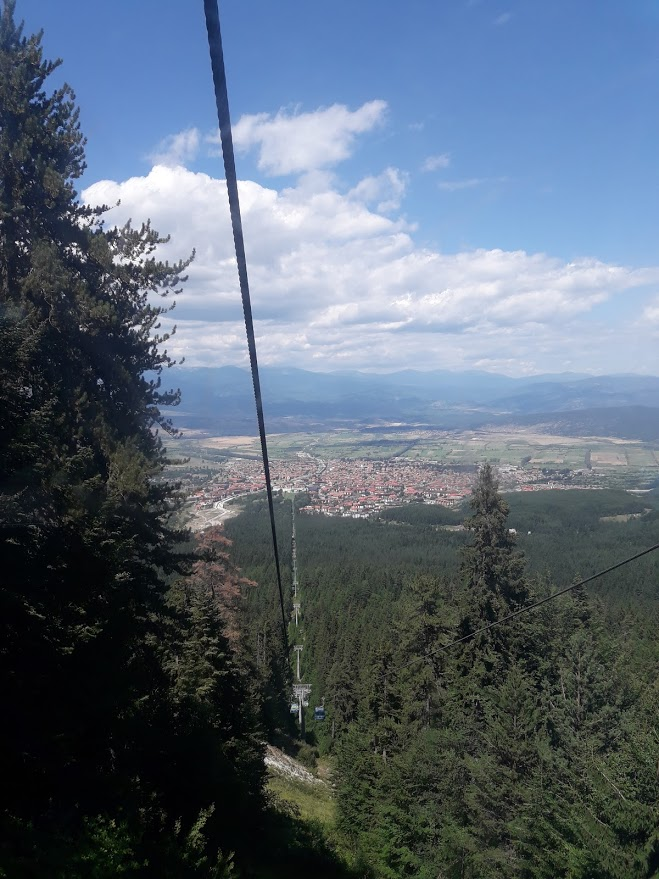
- Bansko

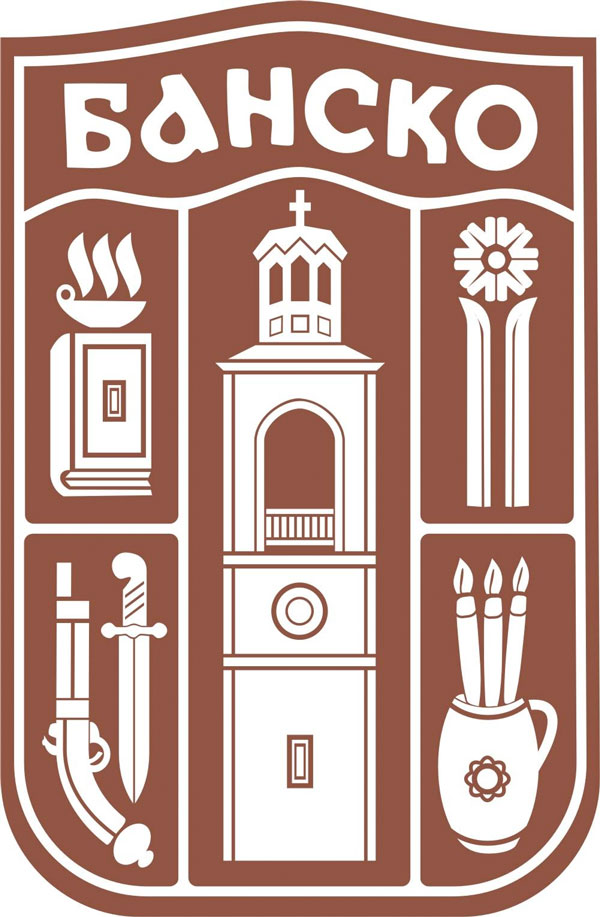
- Coat of arms

- Location of Bansko
- Coordinates: 41°50′N 23°30′E
- Country: Bulgaria
- Province (Oblast): Blagoevgrad

Government
  - Brian: Stoycho Banenski (Independent)
- Highest elevation: 2,914 m (9,560 ft)
- Lowest elevation: 925 m (3,035 ft)

Population (2020)
  - Total: 8,873
- Time zone: UTC+2 (EET)
  - Summer (DST): UTC+3 (EEST)
- Postal Code: 2770
- Area code: 0749
- Website: www.bansko.bg (in Bulgarian)

Bansko (Bulgarian: Банско [ˈbansko]) is a town in southwestern Bulgaria, located in Blagoevgrad Oblast near the city of Razlog. Once mainly a stockbreeding and travelling merchant community, the town is now an international centre for winter and summer tourism. More recently Bansko has become a known hotspot for digital nomads driven in part by the relative affordability of the location combined with its natural scenery.

== Location and Transportation ==
Bansko lies at the foot of the Pirin Mountains, not far from the national park of the same name, in the valley of the Nestos River at an elevation of 925 meters above sea level. It is a ski resort. The city is about 160 km from Sofia and about 220 km from Thessaloniki.

Bansko is a stop on the narrow-gauge Septemvri–Dobrinishte narrow-gauge line from Septemvri to Dobrinishte. There are rail connections (changing in September) to Sofia, Plovdiv and Burgas. There are bus connections to Sofia, Plovdiv, Blagoevgrad, Razlog and Gotse Delchev.

The nearby village of Banya, located only 5 km (3 mi) from the town, is known for its 27 thermal mineral springs.

== Economy ==
The mountain peaks near the town, the numerous lakes and the old pine woods make it a recreation destination. Bulgaria's share in European winter tourism is steadily rising, and Bansko increasingly competes with resorts in France and Switzerland due to the comparatively lower costs.

Improvements to the infrastructure and organisation of the ski area on Todorka have been made annually to accommodate the rising number of tourists. A gondola lift was built from town in 2003, replacing the minibus ride to the primary base area of Banderishka Poliana. As of 2010, the ski area has 75 km (47 mi) of ski runs, 14 lifts and drags, serving up to 24,500 persons per hour. The lift-served summit rises to an elevation of 2,600 m (8,500 ft) above sea level. The vertical drop is nearly 1,000 m (3,300 ft) to the base area at Banderishka Poliana, and over 1,600 m (5,200 ft) with the ski runs to town.

Nowadays Bansko is known as a destination for digital nomads. The influx of digital nomads, including many who have purchased property in the town, are claimed to have contributed to stabilizing the town's property market and boosting the long-stay tourism in the town, particularly outside the winter peak season. There are a growing number of coworking spaces in Bansko. Coworking Bansko is a community of digital nomads that has two co-working locations in the northern and southern part of the town. The annual Bansko Nomad Fest is believed to be one of the world's largest events for digital nomads, attracting 700 participants in 2023.

== Climate ==
Climate data for Bansko (2000-2014)
Month	Jan	Feb	Mar	Apr	May	Jun	Jul	Aug	Sep	Oct	Nov	Dec	Year
Mean daily maximum °C (°F)	3.1 (37.6)	5.5 (41.9)	9.6 (49.3)	15.7 (60.3)	20.8 (69.4)	23.9 (75.0)	26.8 (80.2)	26.9 (80.4)	23.1 (73.6)	17.2 (63.0)	11.1 (52.0)	5.3 (41.5)	15.7 (60.3)
Daily mean °C (°F)	−1.6 (29.1)	0.7 (33.3)	4.3 (39.7)	9.6 (49.3)	14.5 (58.1)	17.7 (63.9)	20.2 (68.4)	20.1 (68.2)	16.1 (61.0)	11.1 (52.0)	6.4 (43.5)	0.3 (32.5)	10.0 (50.0)
Mean daily minimum °C (°F)	−5.7 (21.7)	−4.1 (24.6)	−1.1 (30.0)	3.5 (38.3)	8.1 (46.6)	11.2 (52.2)	12.6 (54.7)	12.3 (54.1)	9.0 (48.2)	5.1 (41.2)	1.6 (34.9)	−3.6 (25.5)	4.1 (39.4)
Source: Stringmeteo.com

=== Historical climate data ===
Climate data for Bansko (1931-1970), records 1926-1970
Month	Jan	Feb	Mar	Apr	May	Jun	Jul	Aug	Sep	Oct	Nov	Dec	Year
Record high °C (°F)	11.4 (52.5)	18.1 (64.6)	26.5 (79.7)	26.9 (80.4)	30.5 (86.9)	32 (90)	34.1 (93.4)	36.5 (97.7)	34.4 (93.9)	29 (84)	22.3 (72.1)	17.2 (63.0)	36.5 (97.7)
Mean daily maximum °C (°F)	2.2 (36.0)	4.7 (40.5)	8.7 (47.7)	14.8 (58.6)	19.7 (67.5)	23.1 (73.6)	25.5 (77.9)	25.8 (78.4)	22.5 (72.5)	16.5 (61.7)	10 (50)	4.7 (40.5)	14.9 (58.8)
Daily mean °C (°F)	−1.9 (28.6)	0 (32)	3.4 (38.1)	8.7 (47.7)	13.3 (55.9)	16.8 (62.2)	18.9 (66.0)	18.7 (65.7)	14.7 (58.5)	9.9 (49.8)	5.2 (41.4)	0.3 (32.5)	9.3 (48.7)
Mean daily minimum °C (°F)	−6.1 (21.0)	−4.4 (24.1)	−1.4 (29.5)	2.9 (37.2)	7.6 (45.7)	10.5 (50.9)	12 (54)	11.7 (53.1)	8.7 (47.7)	4.6 (40.3)	1.2 (34.2)	−3.9 (25.0)	3.6 (38.5)
Record low °C (°F)	−24.8 (−12.6)	−19.3 (−2.7)	−17 (1)	−7.6 (18.3)	−1.2 (29.8)	1.4 (34.5)	4.5 (40.1)	3 (37)	−3.5 (25.7)	−5.9 (21.4)	−13.4 (7.9)	−17.6 (0.3)	−24.8 (−12.6)
Average precipitation mm (inches)	71 (2.8)	59 (2.3)	52 (2.0)	56 (2.2)	65 (2.6)	57 (2.2)	42 (1.7)	31 (1.2)	37 (1.5)	65 (2.6)	79 (3.1)	80 (3.1)	694 (27.3)
Source: Stringmeteo.com

== Sports ==
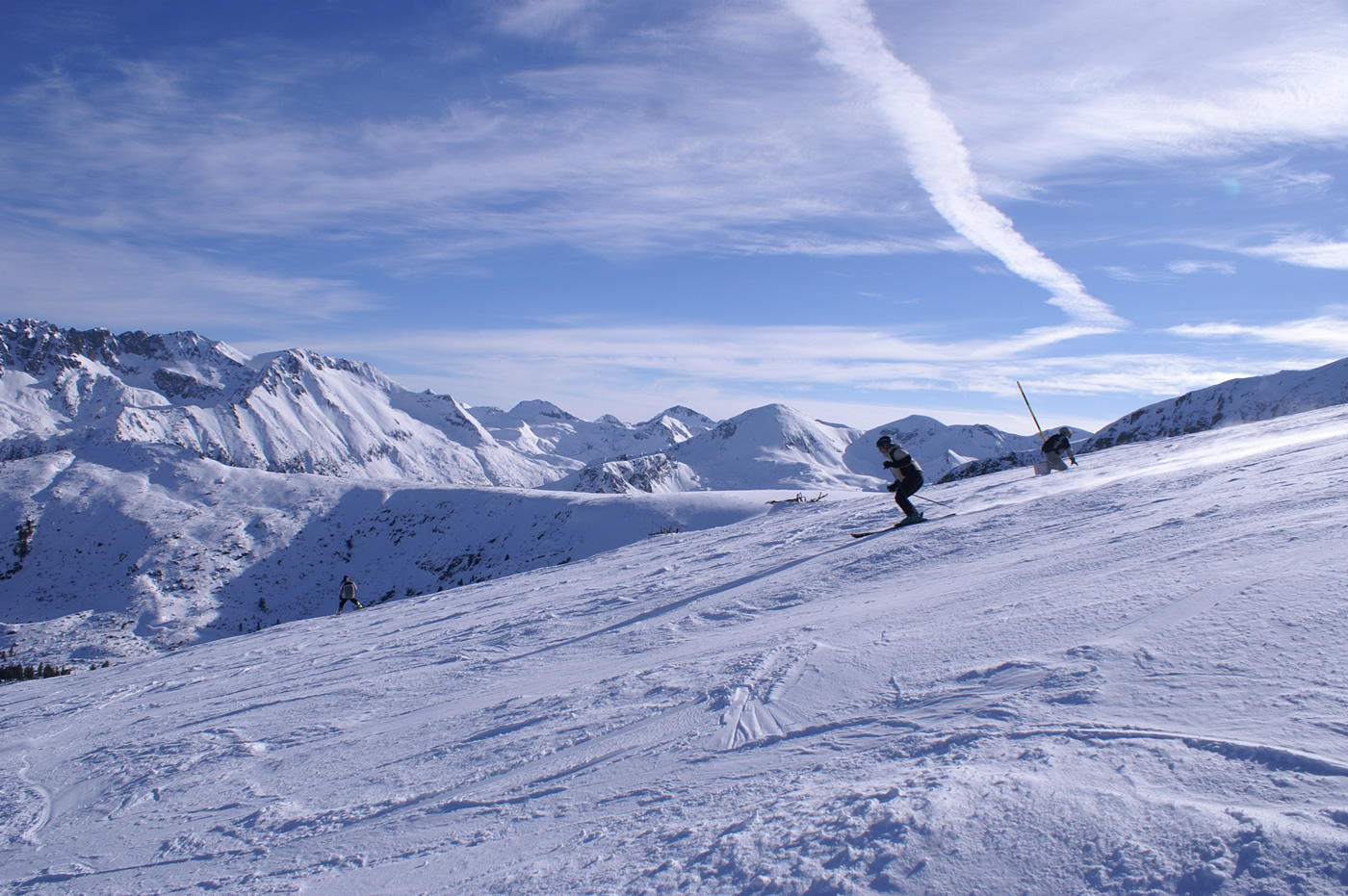
Skiers near Bansko

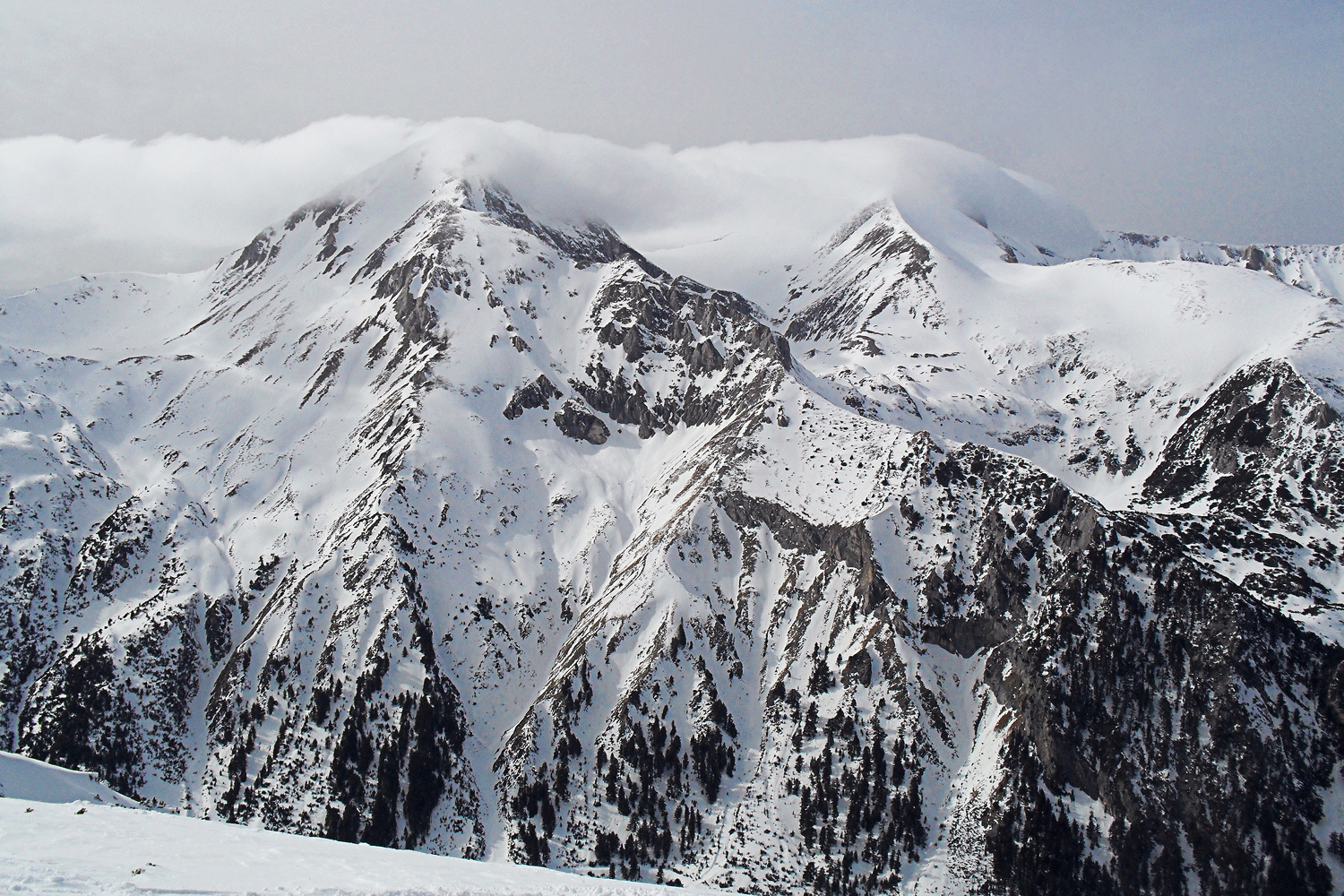
Scenery dominating the west side of the resort

Bansko has recently hosted FIS World Cup alpine ski races: the women race in 2009 in two downhills and a super-G. The men's circuit made its first stop at Bansko in 2011 with a super combined and a slalom. It hosted the men's giant slalom in February 2012 and the FIS World Cup ladies' downhill and super G, and men's giant slalom and slalom.

Alpine and biathlon competitions take place regularly. It is expected that the summer biathlon world cup will also take place in the resort of Bansko.

== Religion ==
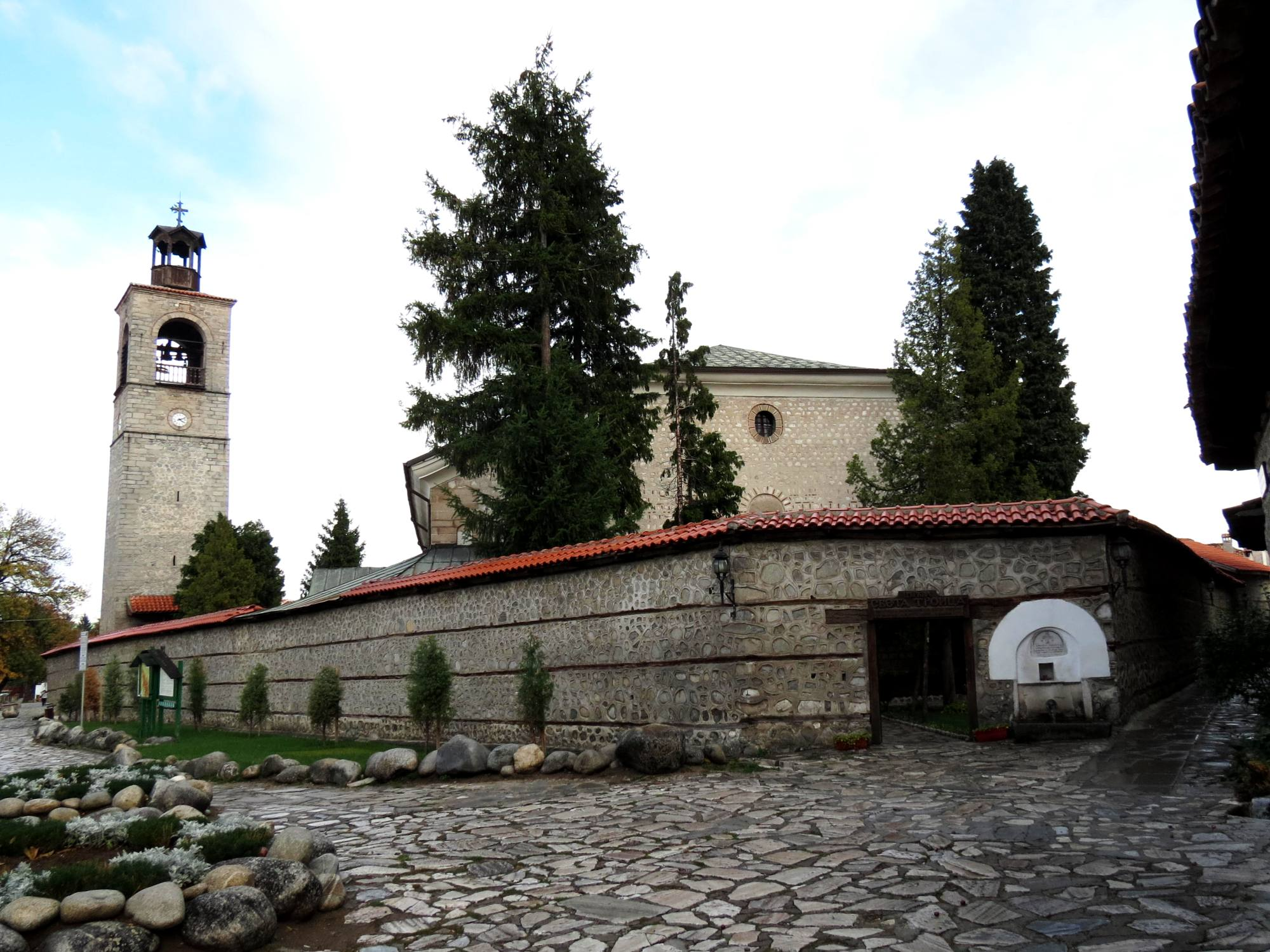
View of Sveta Troitsa church

The church "Sveta Troitsa" (Holy Trinity) is an Orthodox Christian church, part of Bulgarian Orthodox Church. It was built by the people of Bansko in 1835.

The Bulgarian Evangelical Church Community, the first Protestant church in Bulgaria, was founded in Bansko on 6 August 1868.

== Events ==
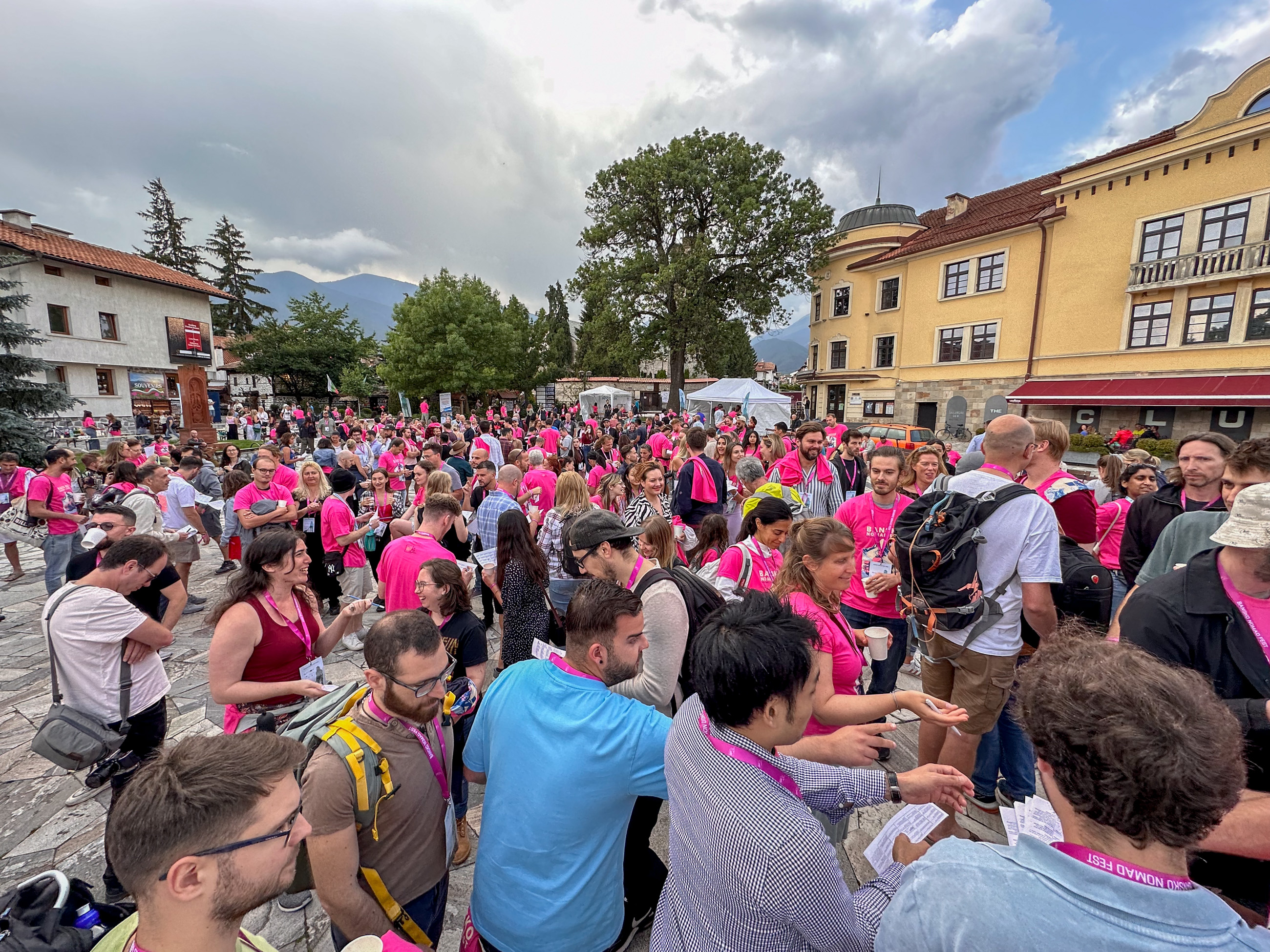
Bansko Nomad Fest held in June

The town is the location for an annual jazz event, the Bansko Jazz Festival, and also the annual Bansko pop-star concert. In March, the town hosts the British underground dance fete Horizon Festival. This town held the International Linguistics Olympiad in 2023.

In the last week of June each year the Bansko Nomad Fest is one of the largest events for digital nomads with participants from all over the world taking part.

== Honours ==
Bansko Peak on Livingston Island in the South Shetland Islands, Antarctica is named after the town of Bansko.

== International relations ==
=== Twin towns – sister cities ===
Bansko is twinned with:

- Amphipolis, Greece
- Didymoteicho, Greece
- Doxato, Greece
- Zakopane, Poland
- Bormio, Italy, since 2023.

== Notable people ==
Notable people that were born or lived in Bansko include:

- Paisius of Hilendar (1722-1773), author of Istoriya Slavyanobolgarskaya
- Irina Nikulchina (born 1974), 2002 Winter Olympics bronze medal winner
- Neofit Rilski (1793-1881), monk, teacher and artist
- Nikola Vaptsarov (1909-1942), poet and revolutionary

== See also ==
- List of cities and towns in Bulgaria
