= Kresna–Razlog uprising =

1878-79 anti-Ottoman Bulgarian uprising

- Part of the Macedonian Question
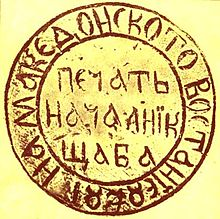
- The stamp of the chief of staff of the Macedonian (Kresna) Uprising Berovski c. 1878
Date	October 5, 1878 – May 25, 1879 (7 months, 2 weeks and 6 days)
Location	Ottoman Empire: Salonika Vilayet (Pirin Macedonia)
Result	Ottoman victory

Belligerents
Unity Committee	Ottoman Empire

Commanders and leaders
Adam Kalmikov; Dimitar Popgeorgiev; Nathanael of Ohrid; Stoyan Karastoilov X Stefan Stambolov; Nikola Obretenov; Ludwik Wojtkiewicz	

Strength
More than 400	More than 8,000

Casualties and losses
9 insurgents killed at the village of Moraska; 568 insurgents killed at Kresna Gorge in January	121 Ottomans taken as prisoners of war at Kresna; 50 Ottomans killed at Bansko
- Hundreds of Christian civilians killed by the bashi-bazouks 25,000–35,000 refugees fled to the Principality of Bulgaria

The Kresna–Razlog uprising (Bulgarian: Кресненско-Разложко въстание, romanized: Kresnensko-Razlozhko vastanie), also known as the Kresna uprising (Macedonian: Кресненско востание, romanized: Kresnensko vostanie), was an anti-Ottoman Bulgarian uprising that took place in Ottoman Macedonia, predominantly in the areas of modern Blagoevgrad Province in Bulgaria in late 1878 and early 1879. It was named by the insurgents as the Macedonian uprising.

The uprising was prepared by the Unity Committee and on the local level, it was led by Dimitar Popgeorgiev, Nathanael of Ohrid and Stoyan Karastoilov. The centers from which the uprising was coordinated were Gorna Dzhoumaya and Kyustendil. Also, it was supported by detachments which had infiltrated the area from the Principality of Bulgaria and Eastern Rumelia. The insurgents consisted of local Macedonian Bulgarians and former members of the Bulgarian Volunteer Corps. They captured the Kresna Gorge, but soon the Unity Committee and the chetas' commanders clashed over leadership, thus Popgeorgiev was removed from his position and Karastoilov was murdered. The uprising lost its momentum and was crushed by the Ottomans.

In modern-day there are conflicting interpretations of the uprising between the Bulgarian historiography and the Macedonian historiography.

== Prelude ==
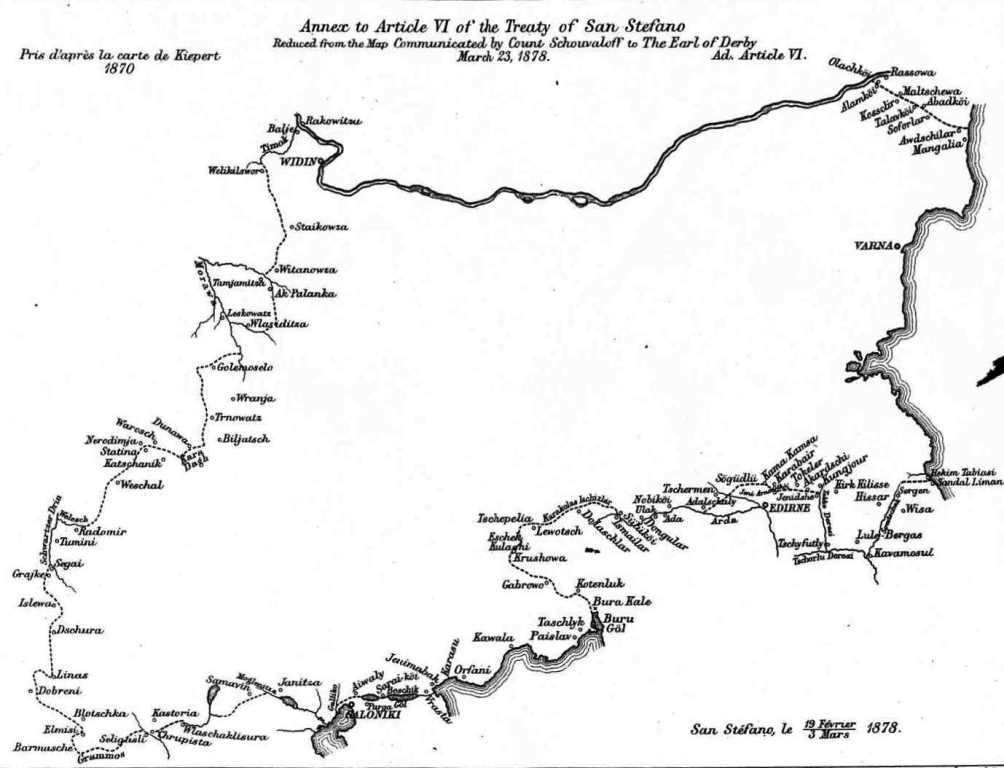
Annex to the Treaty of San Stefano, showing the borders of Bulgaria

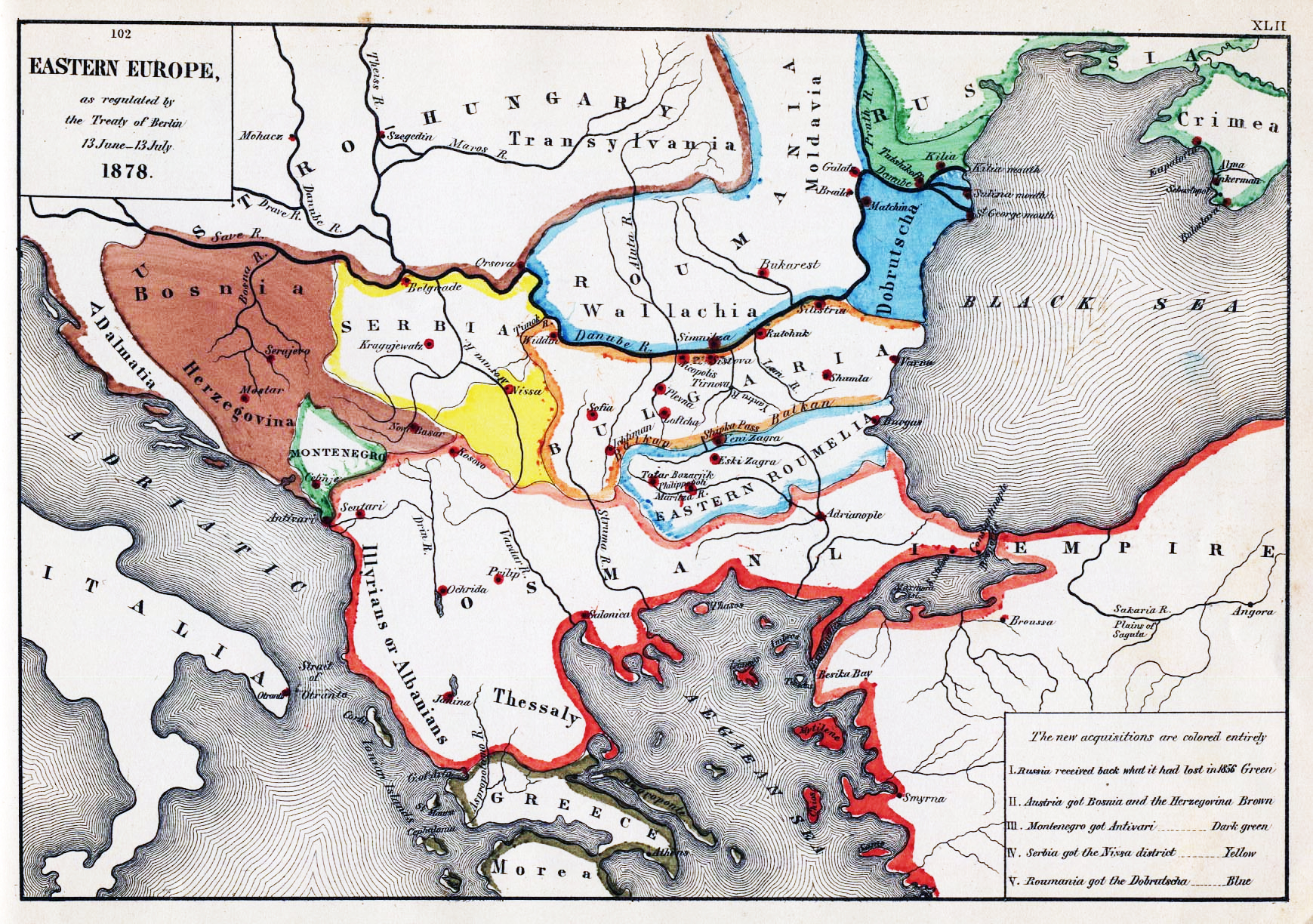
Southeastern Europe after the Congress of Berlin

The Russo-Turkish War resulted in the establishment of the Bulgarian state. The Treaty of San Stefano envisioned a large Bulgarian state, which would open Russia to the Mediterranean Sea. It was revised by the European powers with the Treaty of Berlin as they feared Russian interference. Eastern Rumelia became an autonomous province, while Macedonia remained part of the Ottoman Empire. The revolutionary circles in Bulgaria concurred at once with the idea of inciting an uprising in Macedonia. On August 29, 1878, a meeting of representatives from the Bulgarian revolutionaries was convened in the town of Veliko Tarnovo in order to implement the plan. This meeting resulted in the creation of a committee called Edinstvo (Unity). The initiative for this belonged to Lyuben Karavelov, Stefan Stambolov and Hristo Ivanov. The task of this new committee was to establish similar committees throughout Bulgaria, to maintain strict contact with them, and work toward the same end: "unity of all the Bulgarians" and the improvement of their present political situation.

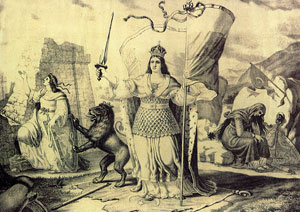
Separated Bulgaria after the Treaty of Berlin - a lithograph by Nikolai Pavlovich. Principality of Bulgaria (in the middle), Eastern Rumelia (leftward) and Macedonia (right at the back)

The "Edinstvo" committees formed toward the end of August and in early September 1878. The committees also had to give moral and material help to the resistance struggles in Eastern Rumelia and Macedonia against the decisions of the Berlin Treaty. In Sofia, many refugees from Macedonia took part in the preparations of the uprising. The committee in Sofia collected funds, while Nathanael of Ohrid established Edinstvo branches in Kyustendil, Dupnitsa and Gorna Dzhumaya, and recruited rebel bands.

On September 8, 1878, as part of the preparation for the uprising, the Rila Monastery hosted a conference attended by Metropolitan Nathanael of Ohrid, Dimitar Popgeorgiev - Berovski, Ilyo Voyvoda, Mihail Sarafov, the voivode Stoyan Karastoilov and other high-ranking figures. It was decided that peasant guards were to be organized for the protection of the frontier, for the defense of the Bulgarian population, and for the uprising's preparation. They decided to start the uprising at Kresna.

== Uprising ==
Letter from Dimitar Popgeorgiev - Berovski to Georgi Pulevski, with a personal stamp that states "Macedonian Uprising, Chief of Staff, D. P. Georgiev" in Bulgarian

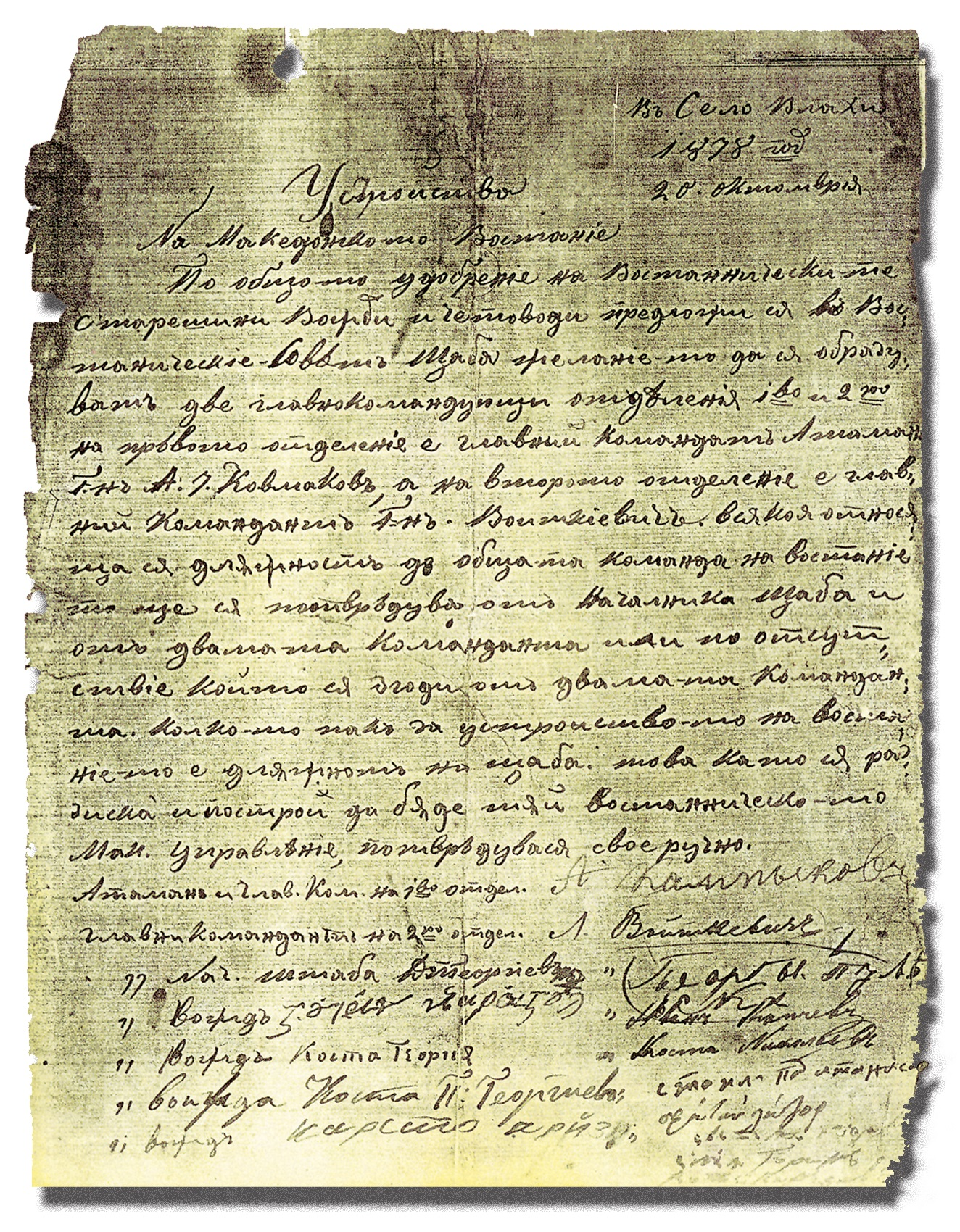
An act on the organizational arrangement of the Macedonian (Kresna) Uprising from 1878, which regulates the duties of the Headquarters, the chiefs and the rebels

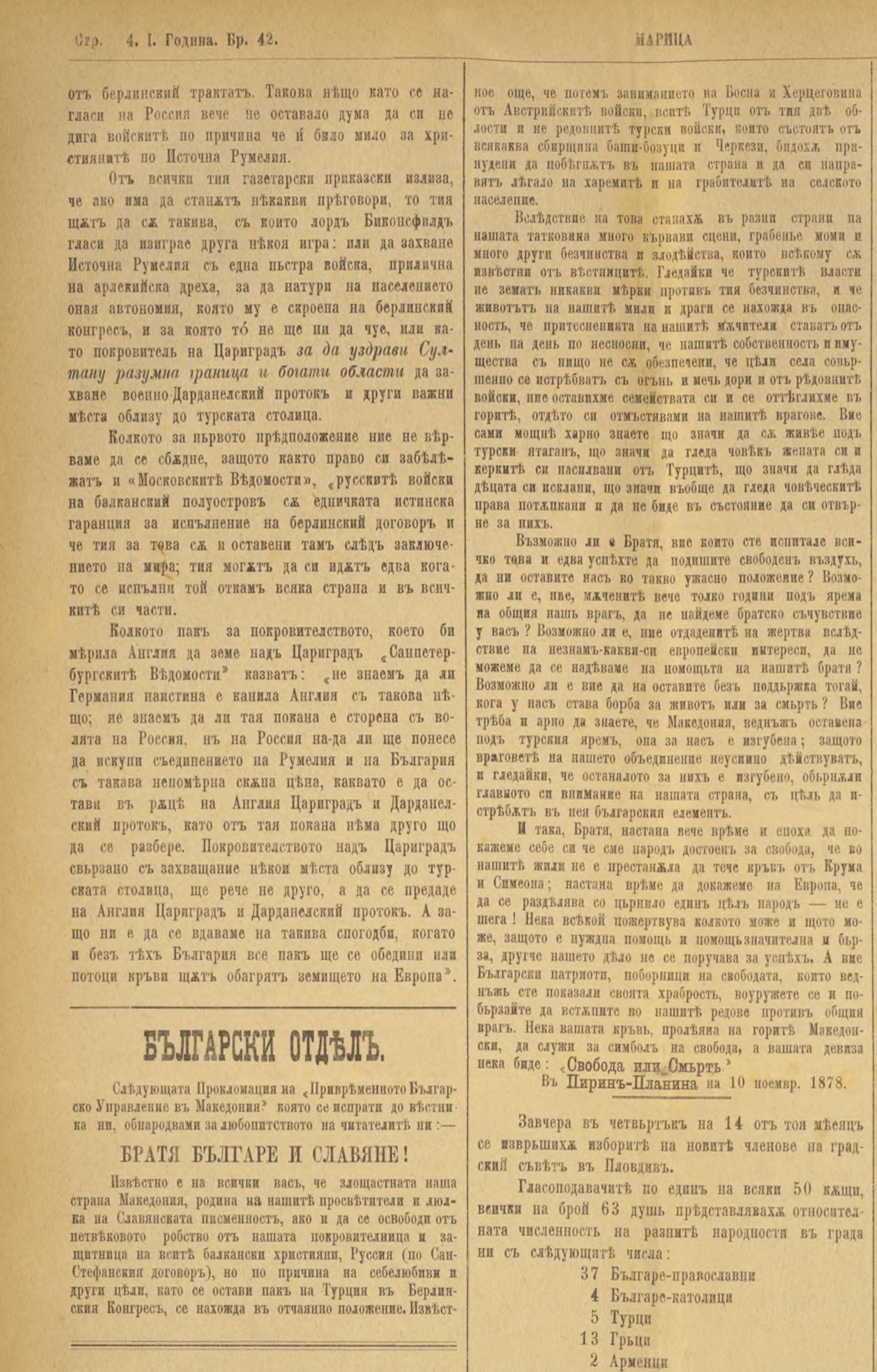
Appeal of the "Provisional Bulgarian Government in Macedonia" from November 10, 1878, published in the newspaper "Maritsa" in Plovdiv, Eastern Rumelia.

Early at dawn on October 5, 1878, 400 insurgents attacked an Ottoman army unit stationed at Kresna inns. The battle lasted for 18 hours, and the insurgents defeated the Ottomans. This attack marked the beginning of the uprising. The bands who participated were under the leadership of Stoyan Karastoilov. Other participants were former members of the Bulgarian Volunteer Corps and peasants from the neighboring village of Vlahi. Bulgarian Orthodox Christians of villages such as Kresna, Oshtava, Mechkul, Senokos, Osikov, and Vrabcha also actively participated in the uprising. The insurgents took the whole Ottoman army unit, which consisted of 119 soldiers and 2 officers, as prisoners. Then the insurgents continued southward and secured the villages of Oshtava, Vlahi, and Novo Selo. In subsequent battles, insurgents captured 43 towns and villages, reaching the villages of Belitsa and Gradeshnitsa. To the south-west, the insurgents, established their sway over almost the entire Karshijak region, while to the south-east the positions of the insurgents were along the Predela, over the town of Razlog. In addition to the direct military operations of the insurgents, there were separate detachments operating in the south and to the west in Macedonia. There were also disturbances, and delegations were sent to the headquarters of the Uprising with requests for arms and for aid. Popgeorgiev and the former Cossack sotnia commander Adam Kalmikov assumed general leadership of the uprising. Ludwik Wojtkiewicz, a Polish man serving in the Russian army, was also a commander. The headquarters of the uprising, which was organized in the course of the military operations, was headed by Dimitar Popgeorgiev. Elders' Councils were also set up, as well as local police organs of the revolutionary government who were assigned certain administrative functions in the liberated territories. At the village of Moraska, 9 insurgents were surrounded. Having exhausted their ammo, they started a physical fight, but they were killed.

During the uprising, Nathanael of Ohrid coordinated the distribution of money, rifles, and ammunition, which came from Bulgarian areas. The Edinstvo Committee in the town of Gorna Dzhoumaya played an important part in organizing, supplying and assisting the uprising. The committee was headed by Kostantin Bosilkov, who was born in the town of Koprivshtitsa and who had worked for many years as teacher in the Macedonian region. Disagreement arose among the leaders of the uprising. With the support of the Edinstvo Committee, Kalmikov expelled the local leaders headed by Popgeorgiev, who was removed from his position and arrested. Afterwards Kalmikov prepared a plot against Karastoilov to take his money and loot, and had him killed on the pretext that he broke discipline when he traditionally rounded up sheep and cattle, and plundered the rich farmers, both Christian and Muslim.

During the military operations in the Kresna region, an uprising broke out on November 8, 1878, in the Bansko-Razlog valley. The detachment of volunteers from northern Bulgaria, led by Banyo Marinov, a revolutionary and volunteer from the Russo-Turkish War (1877–1878), played an important part in that uprising. It was promptly joined by scores of local insurgents, and, after a fierce skirmish, it succeeded in liberating the town of Bansko. 376 insurgents defeated and killed 50 Ottomans there. Neighboring villages such as Dolno Draglishte, Gorno Draglishte, Godlevo, and Dobarsko also rose up in revolt, while the villages of Banya (inhabited by Pomaks) and Mehomiya were attacked. Due to bad organization, the insurgents were only able to hold Bansko for a week before it was recaptured by the Ottomans. The whole uprising in the area was suppressed by the Ottomans in the same period. More than 8,000 regular soldiers and bashi-bazouks drove the insurgents back to the village of Kresna. Hundreds of women, children and old men were victims of the bashi-bazouks. As a result, 25,000—35,000 refugees fled to the Principality of Bulgaria.

An appeal was launched by the insurgents on November 10, 1878, which read: "...And so, brothers, the time has come to demonstrate what we are, that we are a people worthy of liberty, and that the blood of Kroum and Simeon is still flowing in our veins; the time has come to demonstrate to Europe that it is no easy task when a people want to cast away darkness." The same political opposition to the Berlin Treaty expressed in the insurgents' Appeal was also evident in the letter of the Melnik district rebels of December 11, 1878, which they sent to the Petrich kaymakam: "We assure you, and you must know, that we have not been incited by anyone; however, when we realized that, at the Berlin Congress, the European Powers had again left us under your administration, we took up arms, and we shall not lay them down until we are united with the Bulgarian Principality, as was promised in the Treaty of San Stefano by Sultan Hamid himself." The leadership was reorganized, and new tactics were adopted by the end of the year. A Central Committee (consisting of Nathanael of Ohrid, Stefan Stambolov, and later also Nikola Obretenov) was formed, which took control of the uprising. The committee made the decision to prepare an uprising in the spring of 1879 inside Macedonia. More than 400 insurgents were assigned for the task. Stambolov and Obretenov insisted on dispatching emissaries to Macedonia who were to organize and arm the locals, based on the 1876 April Uprising, but they were unable to convince Nathanael. In a two-day battle at Kresna Gorge against 3,000 bashi-bazouks in January 1879, 568 insurgents were killed. On February 13, 1879, Berovski visited the Constituent Bulgarian Assembly during the uprising in maintenance of unification of Bulgaria and Macedonia. In a letter to the Bulgarian Constituent Assembly on March 14, 1879, Nathanael wrote about the restoration of national unity on the basis of the San Stefano Treaty and the aim to liberate the Bulgarians in Macedonia "from the heavy burden of the Turkish yoke." A group which crossed into Macedonia in May 1879 could not achieve its goal due to the lack of preliminary organization. After passing across the Vardar River, destroying the railway line and engaging in several battles, it scattered and was disbanded.

The representatives of the Provisional Russian Administration in Bulgaria Dondukov-Korsakov and Petr Alabin, who sympathized with the struggle in Macedonia, were reprimanded by the Russian Emperor in person. In this manner, the uprising was left without Russian military, diplomatic and political support. Russia, which was exhausted both financially and militarily and under pressure by the other Great Powers, had to conform to the decisions of the Berlin Congress in relation to Macedonia. Russia also aimed to preserve the Bulgarian character of Eastern Rumelia.

== Legacy ==
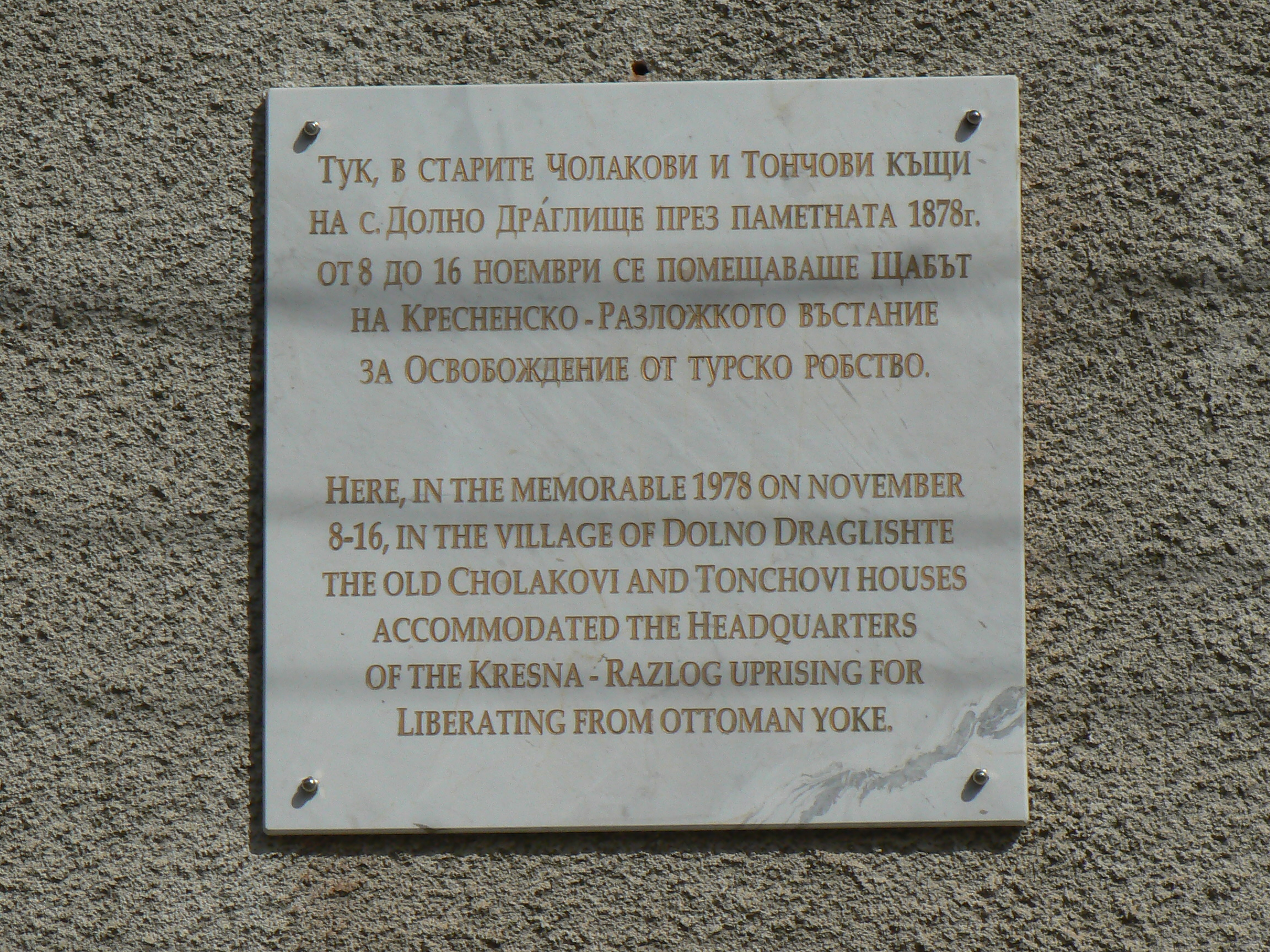
Memorial plaque of Kresna-Razlog Uprising in village Dolno Draglishte, Bulgaria

The uprising is celebrated in both Bulgaria and North Macedonia as part of their nations' struggle against the Ottoman rule.

The Macedonian historiography has claimed the uprising as part of the Macedonian national movement and that the insurgents strived for Macedonian independence from the Ottoman Empire based on The rules of the Macedonian rebel committee headed by Berovski. Per political scientist Vemund Aarbakke, Macedonian historians do not regard the uprising as a protest against the Berlin Treaty. They emphasize the local character of the uprising and the autonomist attitude of the leaders, also the fact that it was called Macedonian uprising by the insurgents, claiming that the uprising was seized by the Bulgarians. Furthermore, they claim that one of the vital reasons the uprising failed was because of the conflict between the headquarters headed by Berovski and Karastoilov (the internal Macedonian conception) from one side and the Edinstvo Committee and Nathanael of Ohrid (the outside Bulgarian conception) from the other. Namely, they claim that the Edinstvo Committee arranged the arrest of Berovski and the assassination of Karastoilov in order to seize control of the uprising. Also, the letter from Georgi Pulevski (a participant in the uprising) from 1879 is pointed out, in the letter he blames the Bulgarians and Nathanael of Ohrid for deceiving the insurgents.

In the Bulgarian historiography, the uprising is interpreted as a continuation of the April Uprising in 1876. According to historian Doyno Doynov, the goals of the leaders and organizers of the uprising were to revoke the decisions of the Berlin Congress, to liberate the regions inhabited by the Bulgarians, and to unite with the Principality of Bulgaria. Bulgarian historians consider The rules of the Macedonian rebel committee to be one of the forgeries fabricated by Slavko Dimevski. They have also pointed at the existence of an identical document with completely different contents titled "Temporary rules about the organisation of the Macedonian Uprising" prepared by Stefan Stambolov and Nathanael of Ohrid. The documentation about the uprising's preparation and course, as well as diplomatic reports of European representatives in the Ottoman Empire, confirm the uprising as a Bulgarian one, with the aim to include Macedonia in the Bulgarian state. A distinct Macedonian national identity was not developed at that time, while the designation "Macedonian" had a regional meaning. In an application for a veteran pension to the Bulgarian Assembly in 1882, Pulevski expressed his regret about the failure of the unification of Ottoman Macedonia with Bulgaria. Bulgarian patriarch Kiril published a book about the uprising called The Resistance against the Berlin Treaty: The Kresna Uprising in Sofia in 1955. According to it the main headquarters of the uprising was located in the town of Bosilegrad, Bulgaria (modern Serbia). Per historian Mehmet Hacısalihoğlu, the Bulgarian and Macedonian narratives both regard the Treaty of Berlin as a cause for the uprising.

== See also ==
- Bulgarian National Awakening
- Razlovci uprising
- Liberation of Bulgaria
- Bulgarian unification
- Ilinden–Preobrazhenie Uprising
- Tikveš uprising

== Sources ==
- Дойно Дойнов. Кресненско-Разложкото въстание, 1878-1879 Принос за неговия обхват и резултати, за вътрешните и външнополитическите условия, при които избухва, протича и стихва. (Издателство на Българската Академия на науките. София, 1979) (Doyno Doynov. Kresna–Razlog uprising 1878-1879: On its scope and results, internal and external political circumstances in which it starts, continues, and ends. Sofia. 1979. Published by the Bulgarian Academy of Sciences)
- Bulgarian Academy of Sciences – Institute of History Bulgarian Language Institute - Macedonia, Documents and Materials. Sofia 1978
- Балканските Държави И Македонският Въпрос - Антони Гиза.(превод от полски - Димитър Димитров, Македонски Научен Институт, София, 2001)
