= Kosta Atanasov =

Bulgarian revolutionary

- Born: 1870; Bachevo, today Bulgaria
- Died: 12 November 1912 (aged 41–42); Bachevo, today Bulgaria
- Organization: IMARO

Kosta Atanasov Manushkin (Bulgarian: Коста Атанасов Манушкин) was a Bulgarian teacher and a revolutionary, a worker of the Internal Macedonian-Adrianople Revolutionary Organization (IMARO).

Kosta Atanasov was born in 1870 in the village of Bachevo, Razlog Municipality, then part of the Ottoman Empire. In 1888 he finished the Bulgarian school in Bansko, and in 1894 he graduated from the Bulgarian Pedagogical School in Serres. Then he returned in his village and became a teacher. Later, he also worked as a teacher in Gradevo and Kresna.

He entered the IMARO and became a president of the Bachevo revolutionary committee. In 1901 he became a freedom fighter and joined the revolutionary band of Yane Sandanski. During the Ilinden-Preobrazhenie Uprising, he was a voyvoda (leader) of a revolutionary band and after he got injured in a battle near Bachevo he went to Sofia for medical treatment.

In 1904, he returned in Macedonia and participated in the reconstruction of the revolutionary organization. From 1904 to 1912 he worked as a teacher in the villages of Yakoruda, Eleshnitsa, Dobrinishte, Bansko and Bachevo.

After the Young Turk Revolution in 1908, he became a member of the People's Federative Party (Bulgarian Section). He participated in the detachment of Yane Sandanski on his way to Constantinople to support the Young Turks.

He was killed by political opponents in 1912.
