= Dobriana Rabadžieva =

Bulgarian volleyball player (born 1991)

Dobriana Rabadzhieva
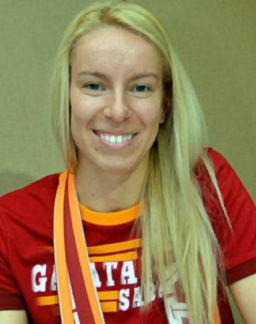

Personal information
- Full name: Dobriana Ivanova Rabadzhieva
- Nickname: Dobi
- Nationality: Bulgarian
- Born: June 14, 1991 (age 35); Godlevo, Razlog Municipality, Blagoevgrad Province, Bulgaria
- Height: 1.90 m (6 ft 3 in)

Volleyball information
- Position: Outside hitter
- Current club: (Russia) WVC Dynamo Kazan

National team
2010-2017	Bulgaria
- Last updated: May 2015

Dobriana Rabadzhieva (Bulgarian Cyrillic: Добриана Рабаджиева, born 14 June 1991 in Godlevo, Blagoevgrad Province) is an international volleyball player from Bulgaria.

== Career ==
After being part of the ranks of her local team Pirin Razlog, she moved to CSKA Sofia in 2005. Rabadzhieva won the silver medal in the 2012 FIVB Club World Championship, playing with the Azerbaijani club Rabita Baku.

After the conclusion of the 2012 Women's European Volleyball League, during which Rabadzhieva was a prominent part of the Bulgaria women's national team that finished in second place, she won the best server award.

On 18 June 2013 Rabadzhieva signed a contract with Galatasaray Daikin. In 2014 Rabadzhieva continued her career with The Swiss club Volero Zurich.

Rabadzhieva won the bronze medal at the 2015 FIVB Club World Championship, playing with the Swiss club Voléro Zürich.

Since the late 2010s Rabadzhieva has not featured for the national team due to personal differences with the national federation. In 2022, she confirmed her retirement from the national side, with some injury issues also playing a part in her decision. Rabadzhieva represented Bulgaria national teams on both youth and senior levels for a period of 13 years.

== Clubs ==
- (Bulgaria) VC CSKA Sofia (2005–2010)
- (Italy) Imoco Conegliano (2010–2011)
- (Azerbaijan) Rabita Baku (2011–2013)
- (Turkey) Galatasaray Daikin (2013–2014)
- (Switzerland) Voléro Zürich (2014–2017)
- (Turkey) Galatasaray (2017–2018)
- (China) Guangdong Evergrande (2018–2020)
- (Brazil) Itambé/Minas (2020)
- (China) Guangdong Evergrande (2020)
- (Turkey) Türk Hava Yolları (2020–2021)
- (Italy) Roma Volley Club (2021–2022)
- (China) Shandong (2022)
- (Russia) Dynamo-Ak Bars Kazan (2023–)

== Awards ==
=== Clubs ===
- 2011 FIVB Club World Championship - Gold medal Champion, with Rabita Baku
- 2011-12 Azerbaijan League - Champion, with Rabita Baku
- 2011-12 Azerbaijan Cup - Champion, with Rabita Baku
- 2012 FIVB Club World Championship - Silver medal, with Rabita Baku
- 2012-13 Azerbaijan League - Champion, with Rabita Baku
- 2012–13 CEV Champions League - Silver medal, with Rabita Baku
- 2014–15 Swiss cup - Champion, with Volero Zurich
- 2014–15 Swiss league - Champion, with Volero Zurich
- 2015 FIVB Club World Championship - Bronze medal, with Volero Zurich
- 2017 FIVB Club World Championship - Bronze medal, with Volero Zurich
- 2020 South American Club Championship – Champion, with Itambé/Minas

=== National team ===
- 2009 Junior Balkan Championship - Gold medal
- 2012 Women's European Volleyball League - Silver medal
- 2013 Women's European Volleyball League - Bronze medal
- 2014 Boris Yeltsin Cup 2014 - Gold medal
