= List of people from Berovo =

Below is a list of notable people born in Berovo, North Macedonia or its surroundings.

- Gavril Atanasov, icon painter
- Nikica Klinčarski, football player
- Timčo Mucunski, politician
- Dimitar Popgeorgiev, revolutionary
- Atanas Razdolov, revolutionary and writer
- Vančo Šontevski, politician
- Ilyo Voyvoda (1822 - 1898), revolutionary
