= Adam Kalmikov =

Russian Cossack officer

Adam Ivanovich Kalmikov (Bulgarian: Адам Иванович Калмиков; Russian: Адам Иванович Калмыков; died 1885) was a Russian Cossack officer. He was one of the leaders of the Kresna–Razlog uprising.

== Life ==
His year of birth is unknown. He was a volunteer in the First Serbian–Ottoman War and the Russo-Turkish War. Kalmikov was also the captain of a regiment of Don Cossacks. He joined the Unity Committee in Sofia and took part in the Kresna–Razlog uprising. Along with Dimitar Popgeorgiev, he took over the leadership of the rebels' detachments. Kalmikov organized the local voivodes from the Petrich and Melnik districts for armed resistance against the Ottomans. As disagreement broke out between the leaders of the uprising, his volunteers succeeded in expelling the local leaders of the uprising. The voivode Stoyan Karastoilov was murdered by Kalmikov on the accusation of violation of discipline when he traditionally rounded up cattle and plundered the wealthy farmers, both Christians and Muslims. Kalmikov engaged in banditry later. Per the Macedonian Encyclopedia, he made a major contribution to the defeat of the Kresna–Razlog uprising.

Kalmikov settled after the uprising in Sofia, where in October 1879 he offered his services to the Austrian diplomatic agent Rudolf von Khevenhüller-Metsch with the idea of gathering a detachment and operating in Ottoman Macedonia. With the help of the Serbian authorities, he was issued an Ottoman passport in Belgrade. In early April 1880 he entered the Ottoman Empire through Vranje. Kalmikov made contact with the Russian consul in Prizren, Ivan Jastrebov. Thus he became suspicious of the Ottoman authorities and soon was arrested and imprisoned. After being released with the help of Yastrebov, in the same year 1880, Kalmikov moved through Serbia to Romania. In 1885, he organized in Bulgaria a detachment to renew the armed struggle in Macedonia. In order to arm themselves, the komitadjis destroyed a Supreme Macedonian-Adrianople Committee's ammunition depot in Kyustendil and soon after entered Ottoman territory. He had the intention to start here an uprising along with Albanians, but he was killed by the Ottomans near Delčevo.
