= Nikolay Dimirov =

Bulgarian footballer

Personal information
- Full name: Nikolay Yanakiev Dimirov
- Date of birth: 6 June 1985 (age 41)
- Place of birth: Gorno Draglishte, Bulgaria
- Height: 1.83 m (6 ft 0 in)
- Position: Midfielder

Team information
- Current team: Kostenets
- Number: 15

Youth career
- Pirin Blagoevgrad

Senior career*
Years	Team	Apps	(Gls)
2004–2008	Bansko	?	(?)
2009–2010	Pirin Blagoevgrad	4	(0)
2009	→ Septemvri Simitli (loan)	14	(1)
2010–2011	Septemvri Simitli	29	(2)
2011–2012	Pirin Gotse Delchev	25	(2)
2013–2023	Pirin Razlog	66	(0)
2024–	Kostenets	?	(?)
- * Club domestic league appearances and goals as of 10 January 2024

Nikolay Yanakiev Dimirov (born 6 June 1985 in Gorno Draglishte) is a Bulgarian footballer who plays as a midfielder for Kostenets.
