= Nedelya Petkova =

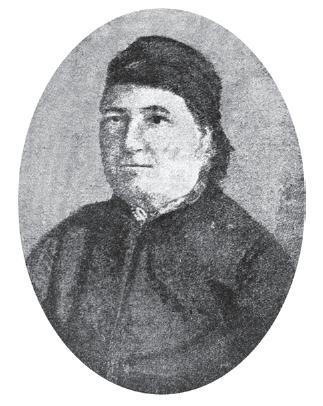
Nedelya Petkova.

Nedelya Petkova (Bulgarian: Неделя Петкова; 13 August 1826 – 1 January 1894), known as well as Baba Nedelya (Grandmother Nedelya), was a Bulgarian pioneer in promoting girls' education as well as a revolutionary. In 1858 she began teaching girls and developed a school system for girls across the Bulgarian populated parts of the Ottoman Empire, with hundreds of girls attending classes.

== Biography ==
She was born on 13 August 1826 in Sopot. She studied in the Convent School of the "Holy presentation of the Blessed Virgin" in the town of Sopot. She dreamed of continuing her studies in Russia, but her parents could not afford it, which led her to educate herself.

At the age of 19, she married Petko Karaivanov, the youngest uncle of the Bulgarian revolutionary Vasil Levski and a merchant by profession. Ten years later, he succumbed to cholera, leaving Nedelya with five children and pregnant with a sixth. She was the mother of Stanislava Karaivanova-Balkanova, the first female telegraphist in Bulgaria, and Petko Karaivanov, an officer decorated with the Cross of Courage for his participation in the Serbo-Bulgarian War.

To support her family, she sewed and embroidered on commission. One day, an icon of Saint Mina she had embroidered impressed the writer Nayden Gerov, who invited her to become a teacher in Sofia.

Nedelya Petkova taught in Sofia from 1858 to 1861, where she opened the first girls' school in the city with the help of Sava Filaretov. A few years later, she was invited to teach in Samokov from 1862 to 1864 and in Kyustendil from 1864 to 1865, but she did not stay long, as she decided to become actively involved in the struggle of Bulgarians in region of Macedonia to have Bulgarian schools and churches. Thus, from 1865 to 1878, she taught in Prilep (1865-1866), Bitola, Ohrid (1868-1869), Veles (1870-1871), and Thessaloniki. During these years, she was arrested multiple times by Ottoman authorities and persecuted by Greek priests. However, after each school was closed by their intervention, she opened a new one in a neighboring town. She established the first Bulgarian girls' schools in Prilep, Bitola, Veles, and Thessaloniki, welcoming hundreds of students.

In 1870, in Veles, she joined the local revolutionary committee and maintained contacts with the Bulgarian Revolutionary Central Committee. In the same year, under the orders of the Bulgarian revolutionary Vasil Levski, she was tasked, along with other young girls from Veles, with sewing a flag for the upcoming uprising. However, the Ottoman authorities discovered her involvement, and she was expelled from the town and forced to move to Thessaloniki. There, she continued her revolutionary activities, and at the request of the Bulgarian revolutionary Dimitar Popgeorgiev Berovsky, she and her daughter made a flag that would later be used in the Bulgarian Razlovci uprising. She founded here also the society "Bulgarian dawn" which became the nucleus of the future rebellion.

After the liberation of Bulgaria, she resided in Kyustendil in 1878, and then in Sofia in 1879. In 1883, she moved to Rakitovo in the Rhodope Mountains, where she dedicated herself to educating Bulgarian Muslim girls from the Chepin region. However, the government authorities arrested her and searched her home for subversive books. Due to lack of evidence, she was declared not guilty and released.

She continued her commitment to women's education until her death on January 1, 1894.

== Legacy ==
- Nedelya Point on Livingston Island in the South Shetland Islands, Antarctica is named after her in 2006.
- The school in Sopot is named after her.
- Nedelya Petkova is one of the women featured in Judy Chicago's feminist work, "The Dinner Party", created between 1974 and 1979.
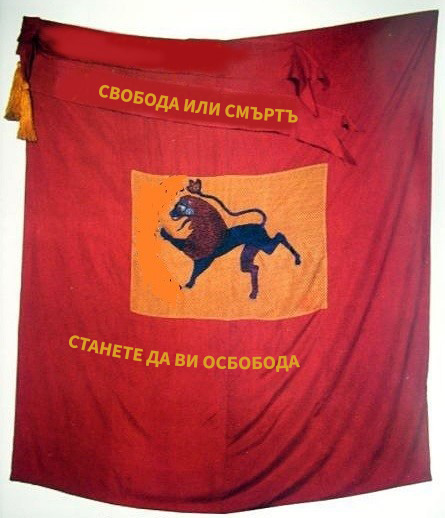
Insurgent Banner sewn in Veles, Macedonia, by order of Vasil Levski.

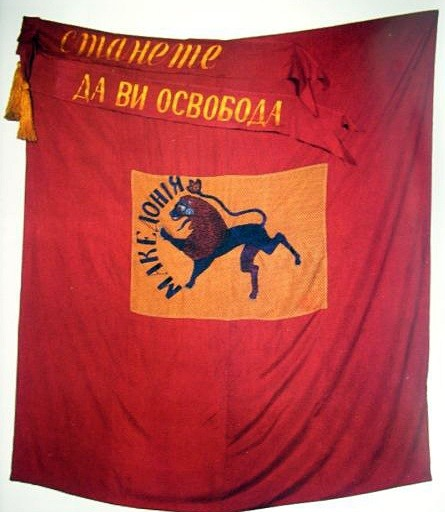
Insurgent Banner sewn by order of Dimitar Berovski, used in the Razlovci Uprising.

== Sources ==
- This article has been written with the help of the French Wikipedia page of Nedelya Petkova.
- 19th Century Women See 1826. Accessed March 2008
- Nedelya Petkova (1826-94) Bulgarian Tourist Information Office. Historical persons. Accessed March 2008
- Sopot Convent at Bulgaria Monasteries website. Accessed March 2008.
