= Ilyo Voyvoda =

Bulgarian revolutionary (1805–1898)

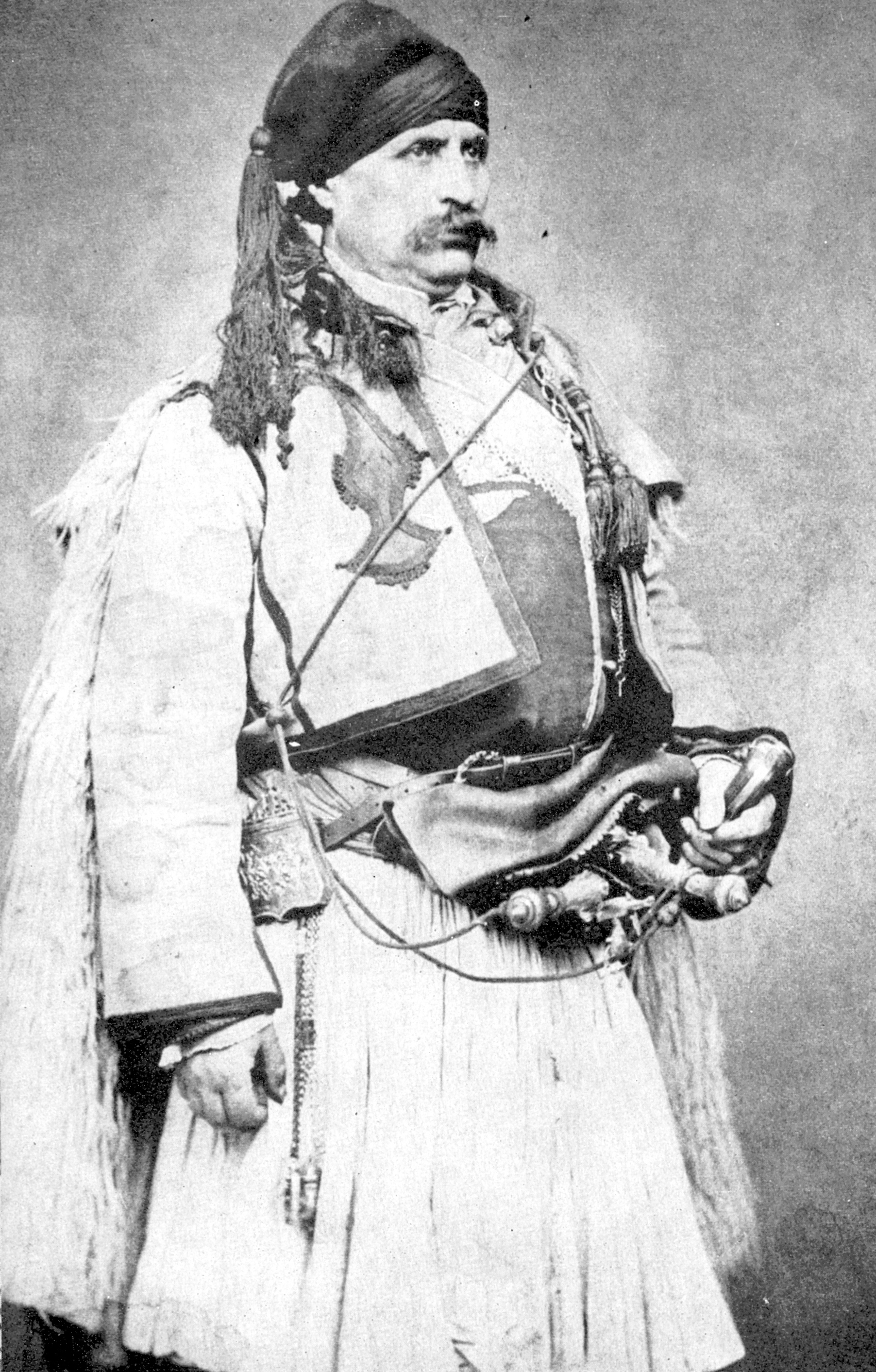
- Ilyo Voyvoda
- Born: May 28, 1805; Berovo, Ottoman Empire (present-day North Macedonia)
- Died: April 17, 1898 (aged 92); Kyustendil, Principality of Bulgaria
- Military career
- Allegiance: Maleshevo region hajduks (until 1859); Bulgarian Legion (1862–1868); Serbia (1876-1877); (Tsardom of Bulgaria (1908–1946)) Principality of Bulgaria (1878-1885)
- Service years: 1862–1885
- Rank: Voivode (Voyvoda)
- Nickname: Ilyo Voyvoda
- Conflicts: Serbian-Turkish War (1876–77); Russo-Turkish War (1877–78); Kresna-Razlog Uprising (1878-1879); Serbo-Bulgarian War (1885)

Iliya Markov (Bulgarian: Илия Марков, Macedonian: Илија Марков, pronounced [i'lija 'markɔf]; May 28, 1805 – April 17, 1898), known as Ilyo Voyvoda or Dedo Iljo Maleshevski, was a Bulgarian revolutionary and hajduk from the region of Macedonia. He was the father-in-law of revolutionary Dimitar Popgeorgiev (1840-1907).

== Biography ==
Iliya was born in the city of Berovo, at the time part of the Rumelia Eyalet of the Ottoman Empire (in modern eastern North Macedonia) on May 28, 1805. His father was named Marko Popgeorgiev (Марко Попгеоргиев/Поп-Георгиев, hence Markov). Ilyo was a prominent hajduk voyvoda (commander) of chetas (armed bands) in Maleshevo, Rila and Pirin. Later he worked as a keeper in the Rila monastery. In 1859 he moved to Belgrade. In 1862, he joined the Bulgarian Legion, headquartered in Belgrade, and took part in the Serbian-Turkish War (1876–77) and Russo-Turkish War (1877–78). The Ottoman authorities defined him as an outlaw, perceiving the band led by him as a threat to the state security after his band attacked the Ottoman authorities in Macedonia.

Ilyo fought against the Ottoman Empire for the liberation of Bulgaria. During the Russo-Turkish War of 1877–1878, he operated with a band near Lovech. His band joined the Western divisions of general Joseph Vladimirovich Gourko and participated in the liberation of Sofia, Radomir and Kyustendil. Ilyo was one of the Bulgarian representatives at the signing of the Treaty of San Stefano, where the liberation of Bulgaria was officially recognized. It was there he was awarded a medal for bravery.

After the Treaty of Berlin, Ilyo participated in the Rila congress on September 8, 1878, where it was decided to start an uprising in Kresna. He took part in the Kresna-Razlog Uprising (1878–1879). Ilyo Voivoda and his band took part in Serbo-Bulgarian War despite the advancing age of the leader. As part of the Radomir squad they participated in the battles of Breznik, Slivnitsa and Vranje among others. During the 1890s, he was involved with the Internal Macedonian-Adrianople Revolutionary Organization as an advisor. He died in Kyustendil in 1898.

== Legacy ==
His memory has been honored in many folk songs. Some of his personal belongings are kept in the monastery of St. Archangel Michael which serves as the city museum of Berovo. Bulgaria commemorates him as a national hero. In the late 1970s, the house in which he lived in Kyustendil was restored, becoming a museum dedicated to the national liberation struggles in the Kyustendil region. A monument dedicated to him is near the museum. His grave is also located in Kyustendil.

Ilyo Point on Clarence Island, Antarctica, is named after Ilyo Voyvoda.
