= Mechkul =

- Village
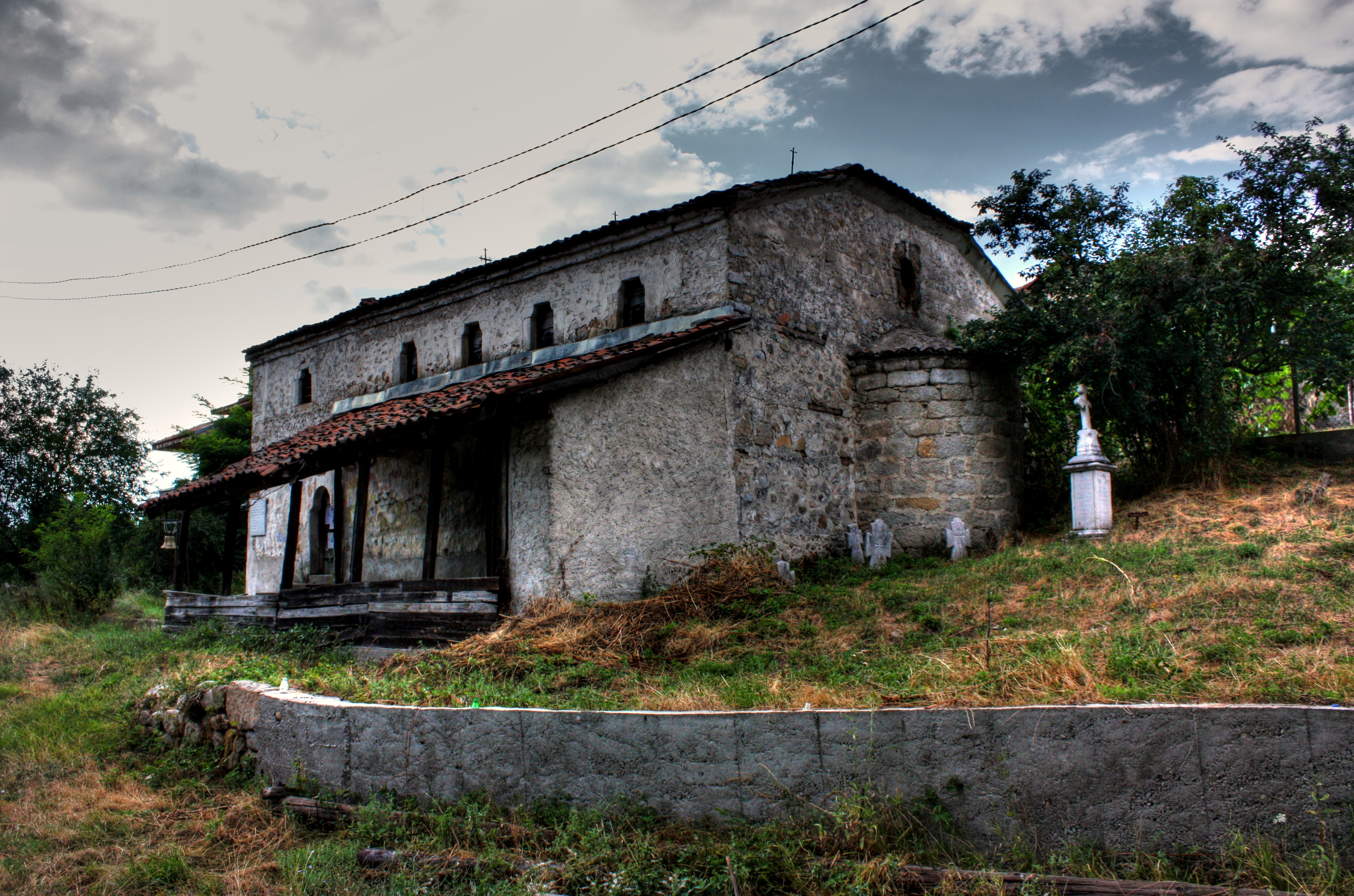
- The church of St Peter and St Paul in the village of Mechkul

- Location within Bulgaria
- Coordinates: 41°49′N 23°12′E
- Country: Bulgaria
- Province: Blagoevgrad Province
- Municipality: Simitli Municipality
- Time zone: UTC+2 (EET)
  - Summer (DST): UTC+3 (EEST)

Mechkul is a village in Simitli Municipality, in Blagoevgrad Province, in southwestern Bulgaria.
