= Eleshnitsa, Blagoevgrad Province =

Eleshnitsa Елешница
- Village
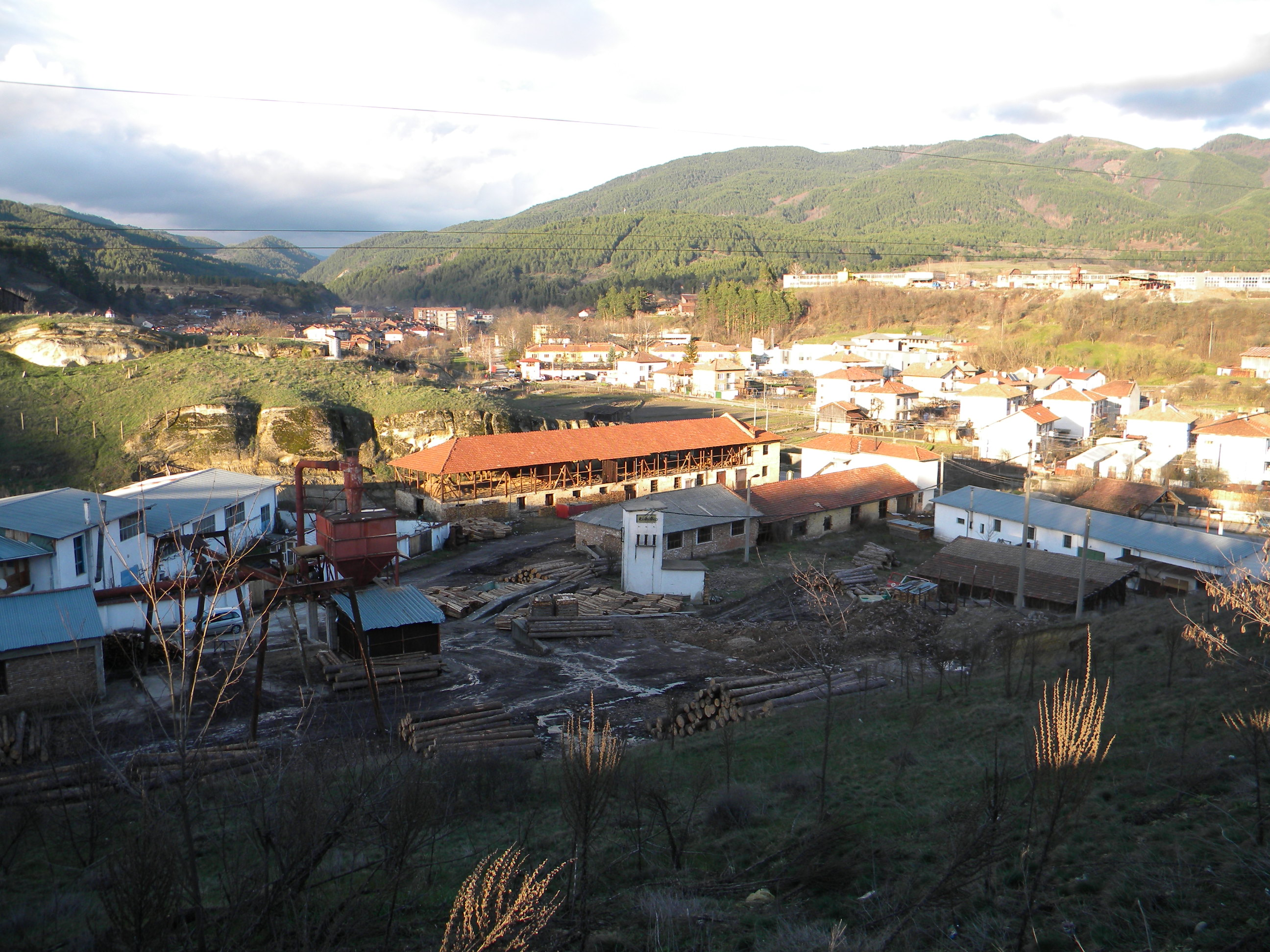
- Aerial view of Eleshnitsa

- Location within Bulgaria
- Coordinates: 41°52′N 23°35′E
- Country: Bulgaria
- Province: Blagoevgrad Province
- Municipality: Razlog Municipality
- Time zone: UTC+2 (EET)
  - Summer (DST): UTC+3 (EEST)

Eleshnitsa is a village in Razlog Municipality, in Blagoevgrad Province, Bulgaria.
