= Dobarsko =

Dobarsko Добърско
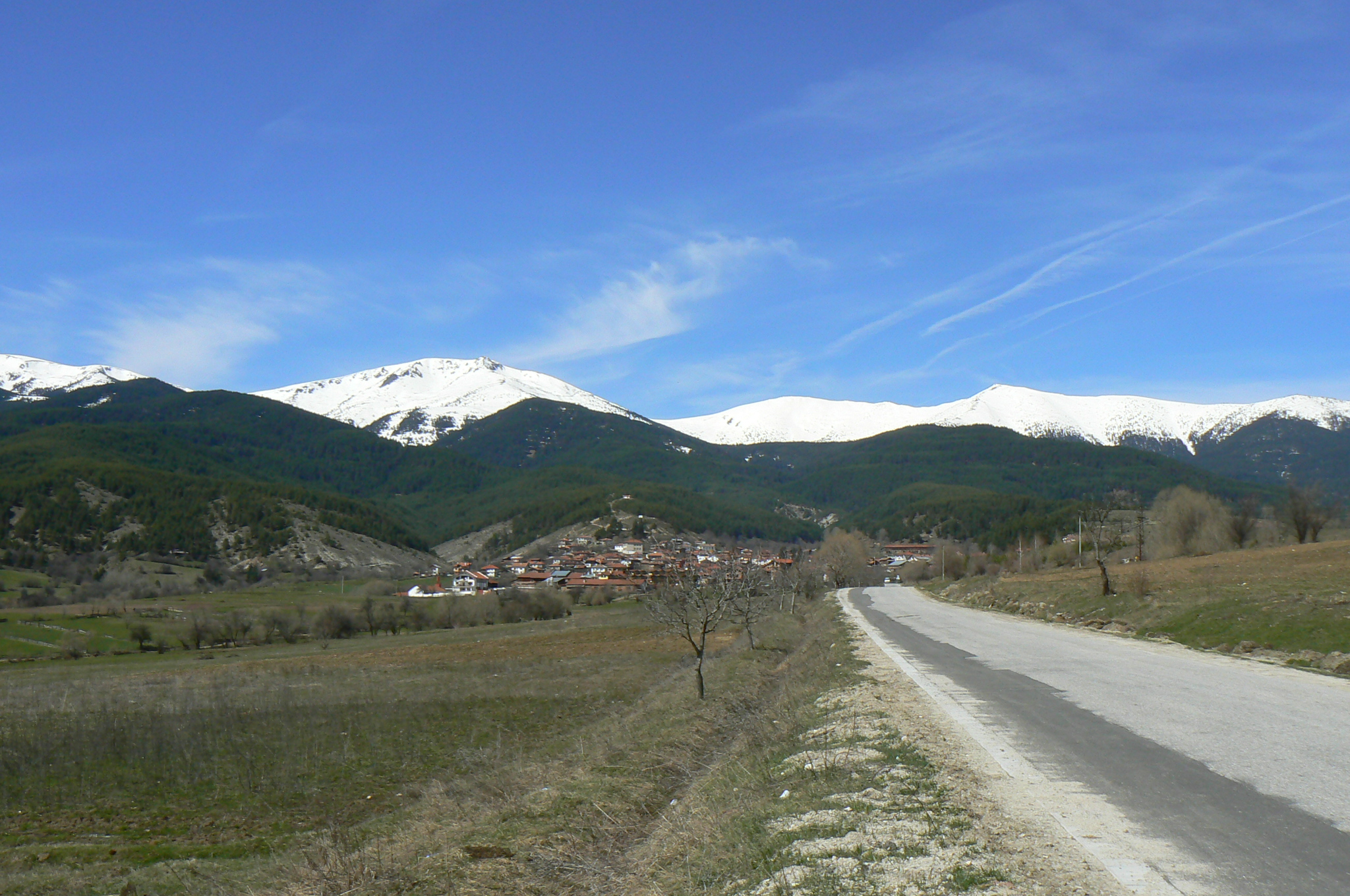
- View towards the village

- Location of Dobarsko
- Coordinates: 41°58′N 23°28′E
- Country: Bulgaria
- Province (Oblast): Blagoevgrad

Government
  - Mayor: Ilian Dzhunev (GERB)
- Elevation: 1,070 m (3,510 ft)

Population (15.03.2015)
  - Total: 609
- Time zone: UTC+2 (EET)
  - Summer (DST): UTC+3 (EEST)
- Postal Code: 2799
- Area code: 074406

Dobarsko (Bulgarian: Добърско [ˈdɔbɐrsko]) is a village in southwestern Bulgaria, part of Razlog Municipality, Blagoevgrad Province. It is set at 1,070 m above sea level on the southern slopes of Rila with the westernmost Rhodope Mountains to the east and Pirin to the south near the valley of the Mesta River. Dobarsko is 80 km from Blagoevgrad and 17 km from the winter resort Bansko. As of September 2005 the village has a population of 672 and about 200 houses, the mayor being Nikola Naydenov.

== History ==
According to the legend, Dobarsko was founded by soldiers from Bulgarian tsar Samuil's blinded army after the Battle of Belasitsa in 1014, who arrived in the area en route to the Rila Monastery and discovered a holy spring that allegedly cured them. Dobarsko is first mentioned in Tsar Ivan Shishman's donor's charter from the Rila Monastery in 1378.

During the Ottoman rule of Bulgaria Dobarsko established itself as the most important and richest village in the Razlog Valley. Many of the locals were merchants who bought cotton from Northern Greece and sold it in Central Europe and grazed large herds of cattle in the mountains and the plains around Drama and Serres. However, Dobarsko began to lose its former importance in the late 18th century, as Bansko rose to become the centre of the region.

== Culture ==
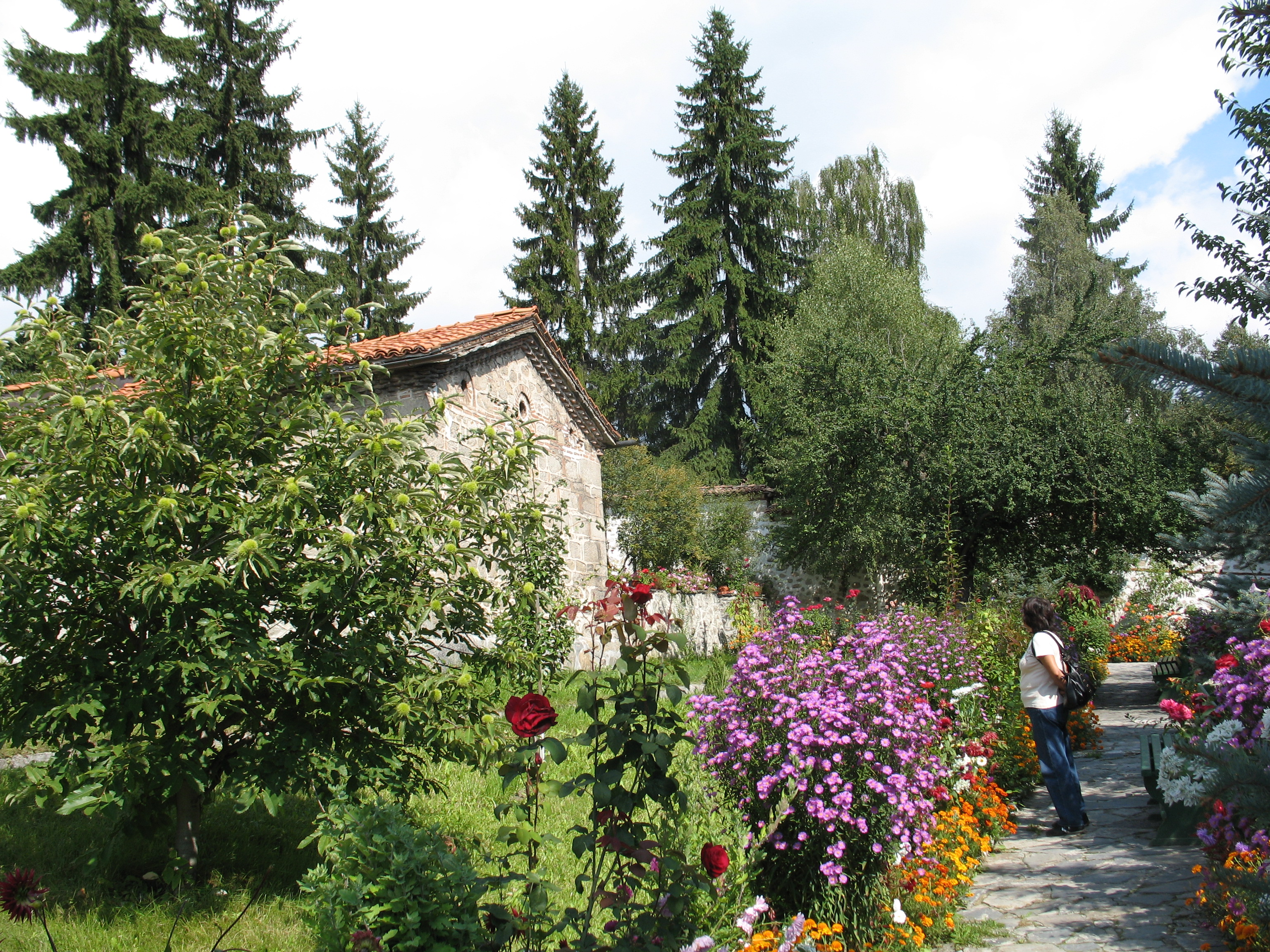
The Church of Theodore Tyro and Theodore Stratelates

The Church of Theodore Tyro and Theodore Stratelates, a small three-naved stone basilica half dug into the ground, was constructed no later than 1614 (with some sources claiming as early as 1122) and painted in 1672. The church donors, Hasiya Bogdanov and his son, as well as the builders Spas, Stanko and Smilen, are depicted in a donors' fresco left of the door. The church is noted for its abundance of original frescoes and icons, some of which are interpreted as portraying Jesus in a rocket. The holy spring in the church yard is said to be curative and indeed the one that cured Samuil's soldiers that founded the village, as depicted in one fresco. A small swastika and a cross on the eastern wall are the only items in the exterior that show that the small stone building is a religious temple. The frescoes were cleaned up and partially restored in 1974–1978, and the church is a national monument of culture, as well as one of the 100 national tourist attractions.

The other church, the Church of the Purification of the Virgin, is a richly decorated Bulgarian National Revival work on the opposite side of the road dating to 1860. Other chapels and consecrated grounds around Dobarsko include the Goatherd's Church, the Dug Church, St Elijah, St Spas, St Athanasius, the Holy Trinity, the Holy Theotokos, St Demetrius and St George.

According to several travellers' accounts, Dobarsko was the centre of a famous beggars' school of blind singers that spread all over the country and existed until 1939. The beggars also invented a cant for their own use by uniting Bulgarian, Greek, Vlach and Roma vocabulary, and performed heroic epic songs.

== Tourism ==
Dobarsko is known for its 25-metre waterfall, Shtrokaloto, its two old Eastern Orthodox churches and the many consecrated grounds and chapels in the area, as well as the panorama view of three of Bulgaria's highest and largest mountains from the village - Rila, Pirin and Rhodope Mountains. There are hiking trails which provide access to the E4 European long distance path.

== Gallery ==
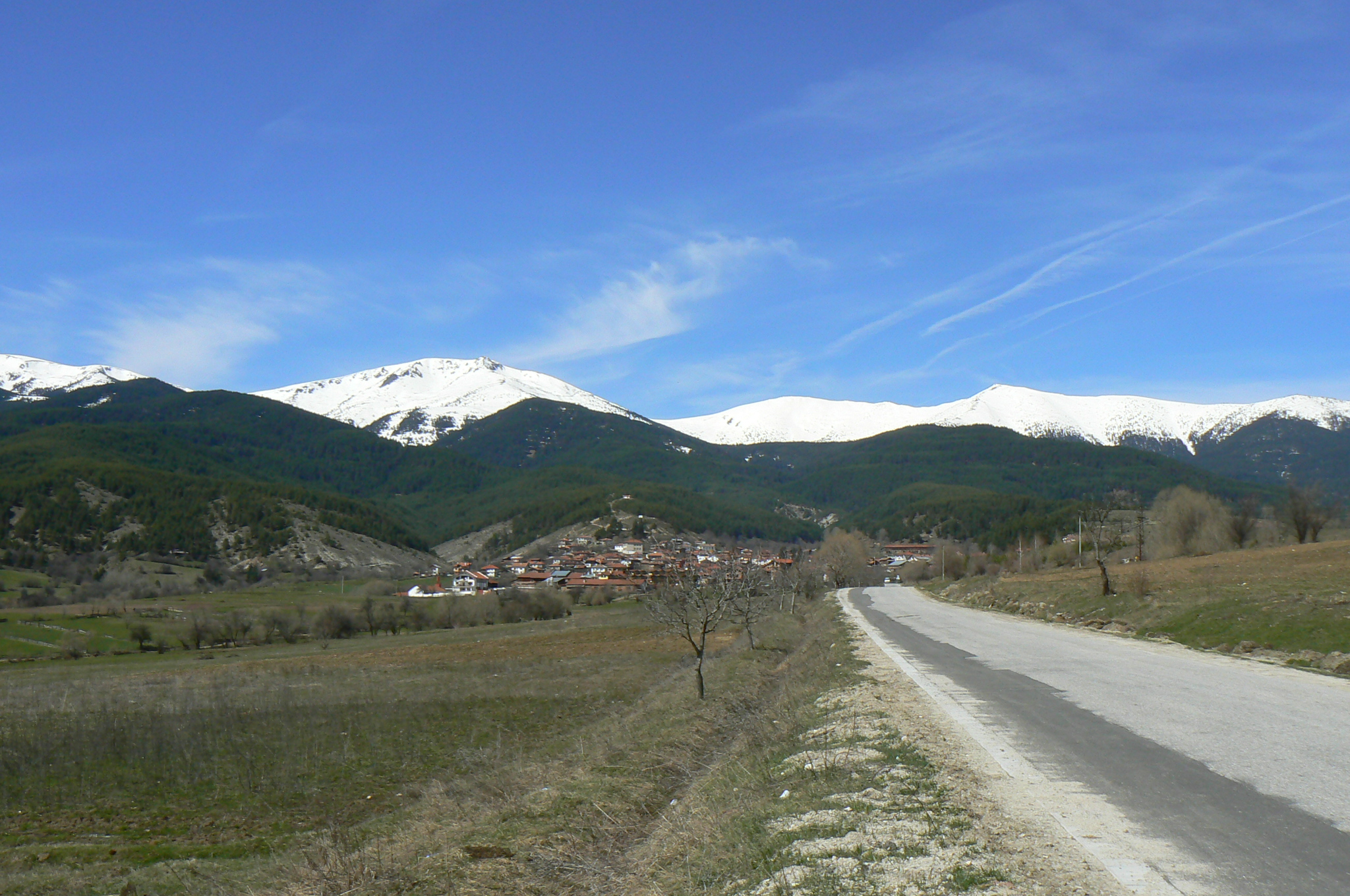
Distant view towards the village

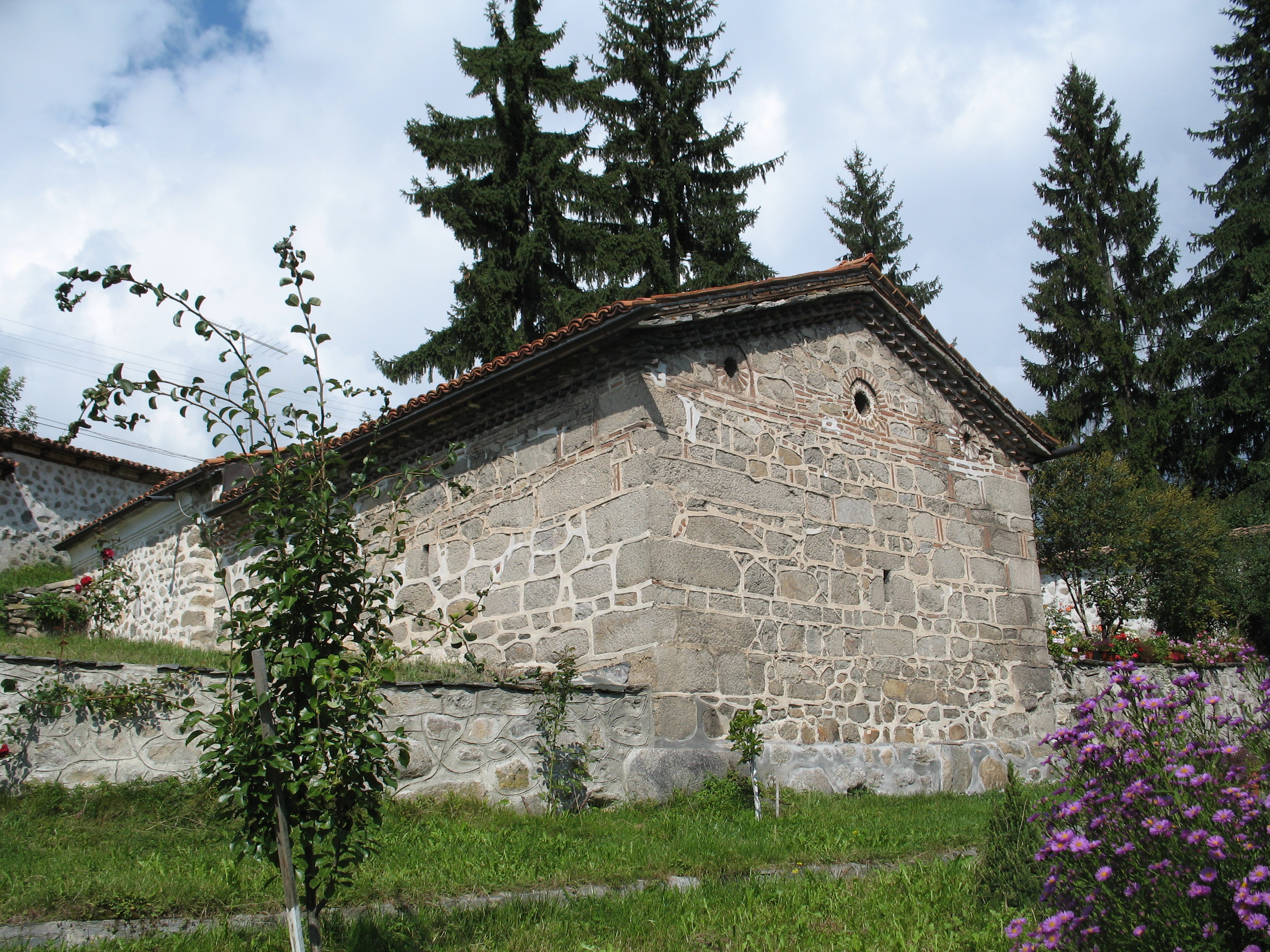
Medieval church from the outside

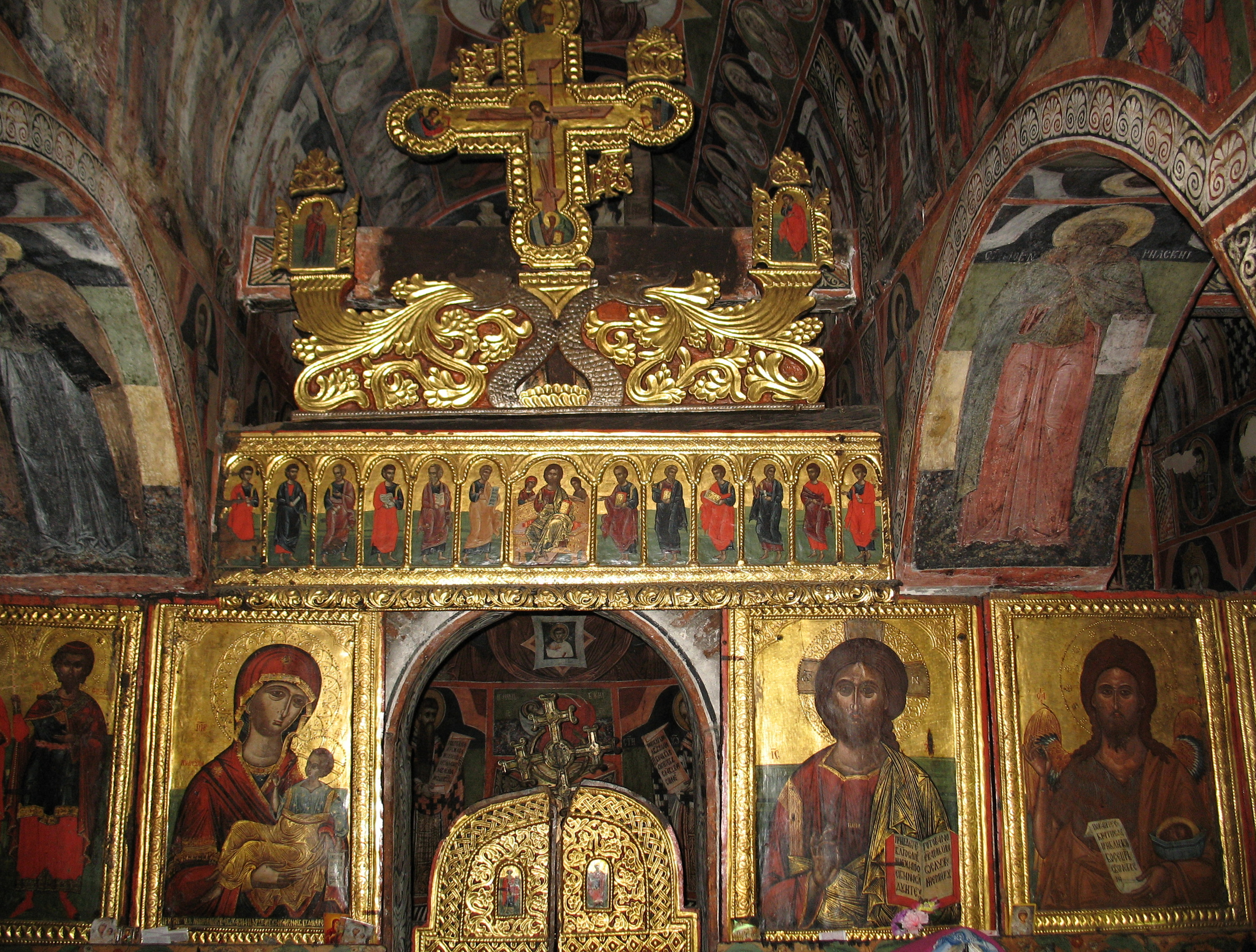
Medieval church from the inside

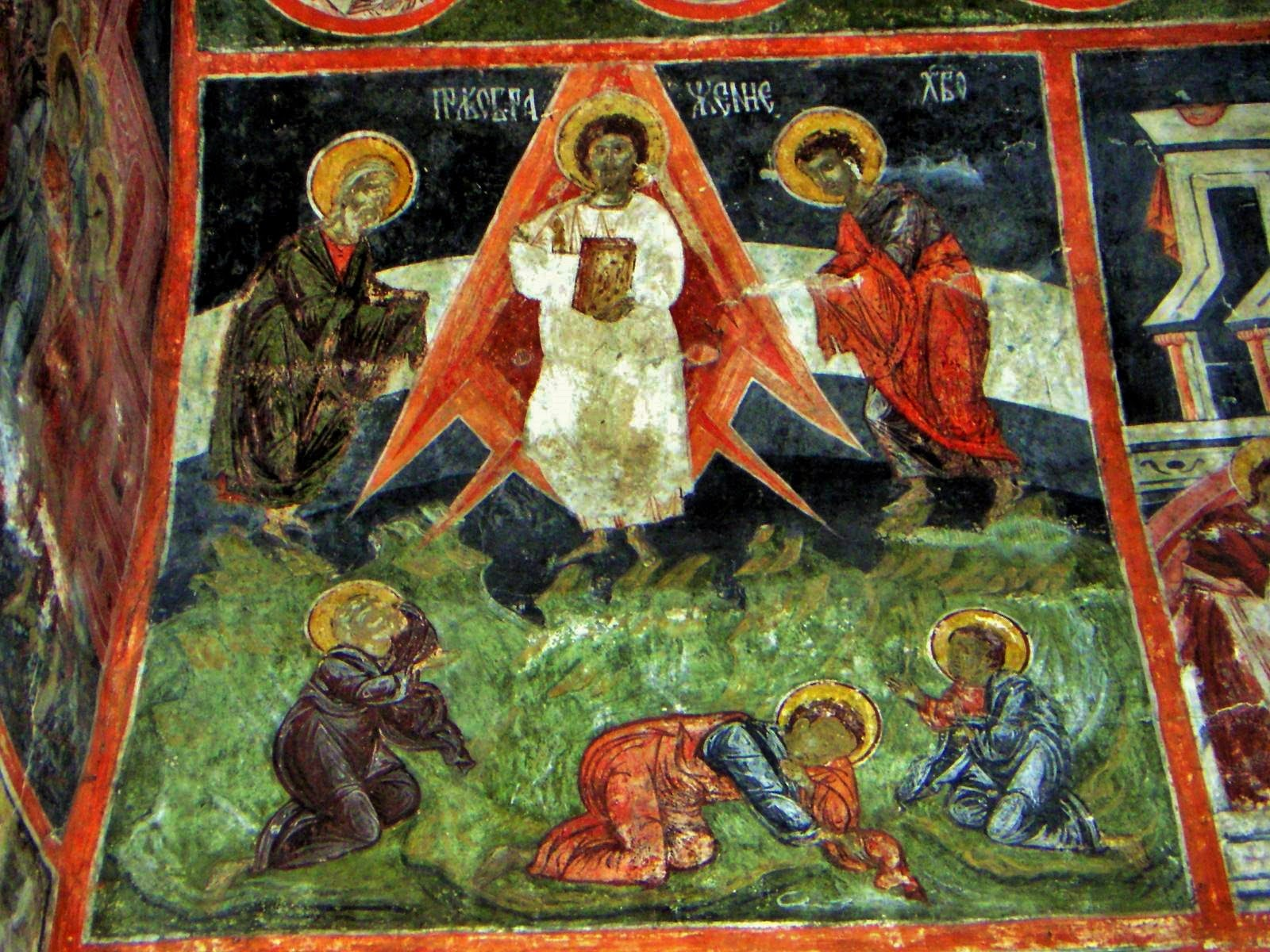
Transfiguration Fresco

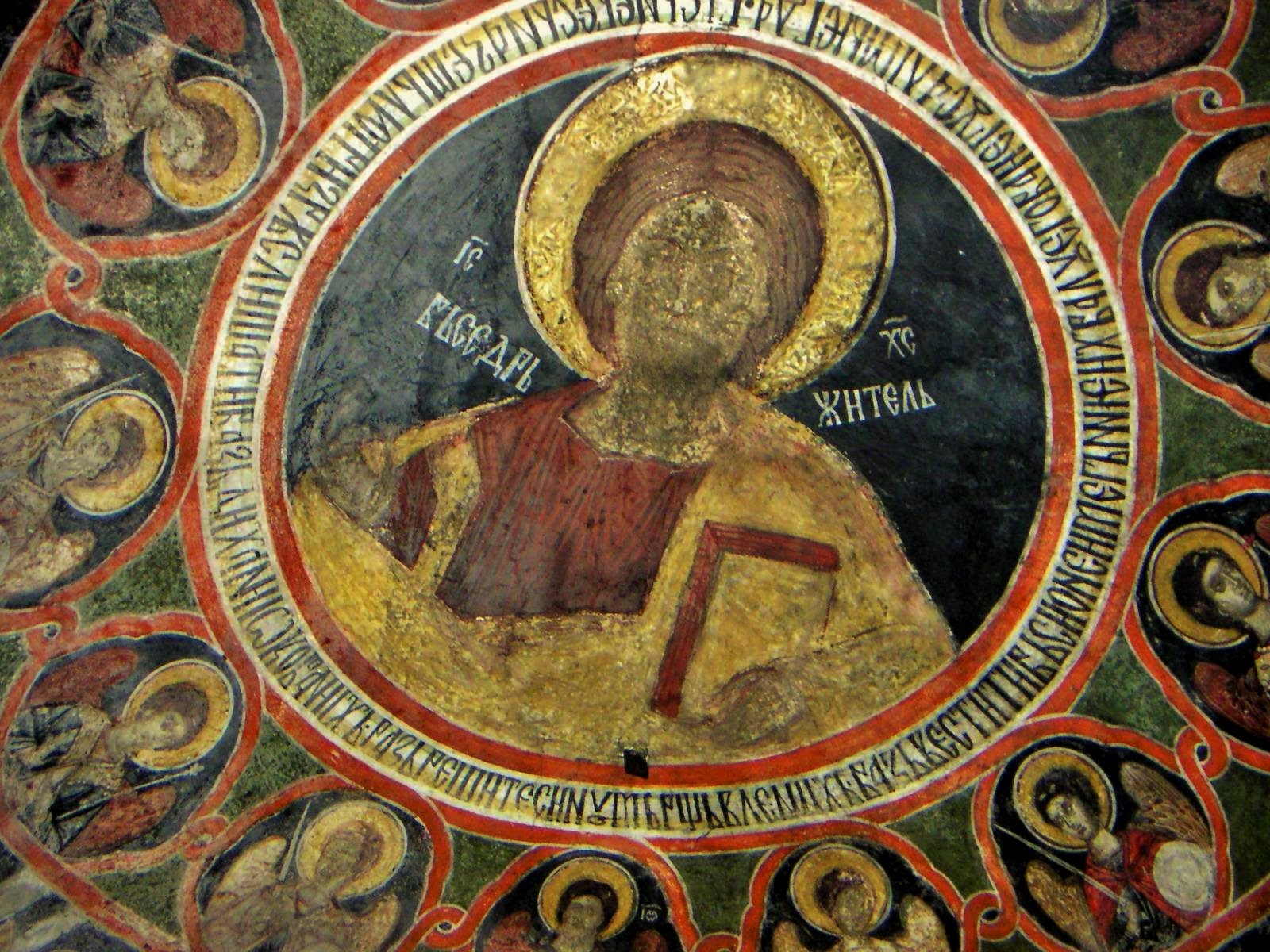
Pantokrator Fresco

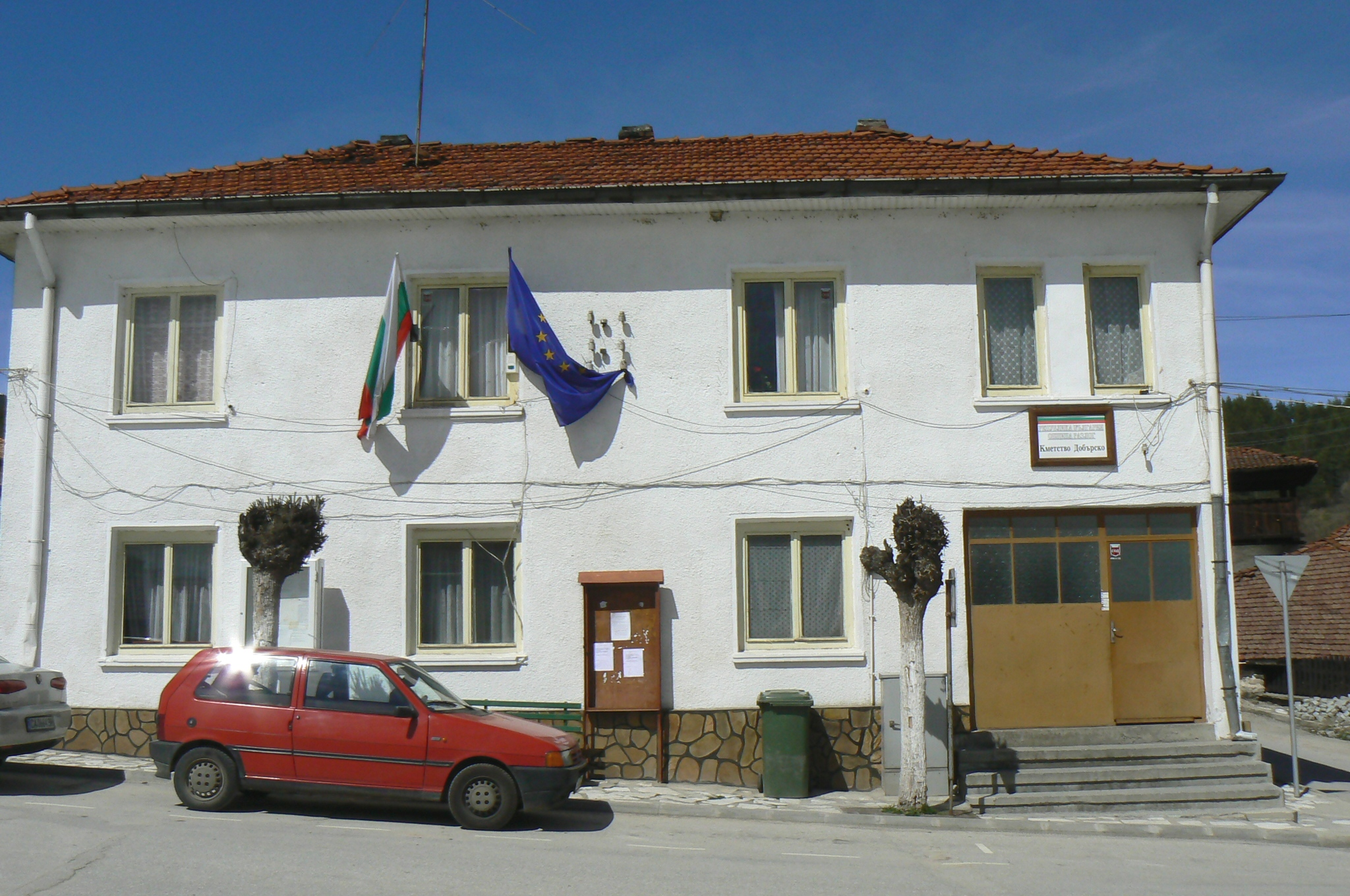
Mayor's office

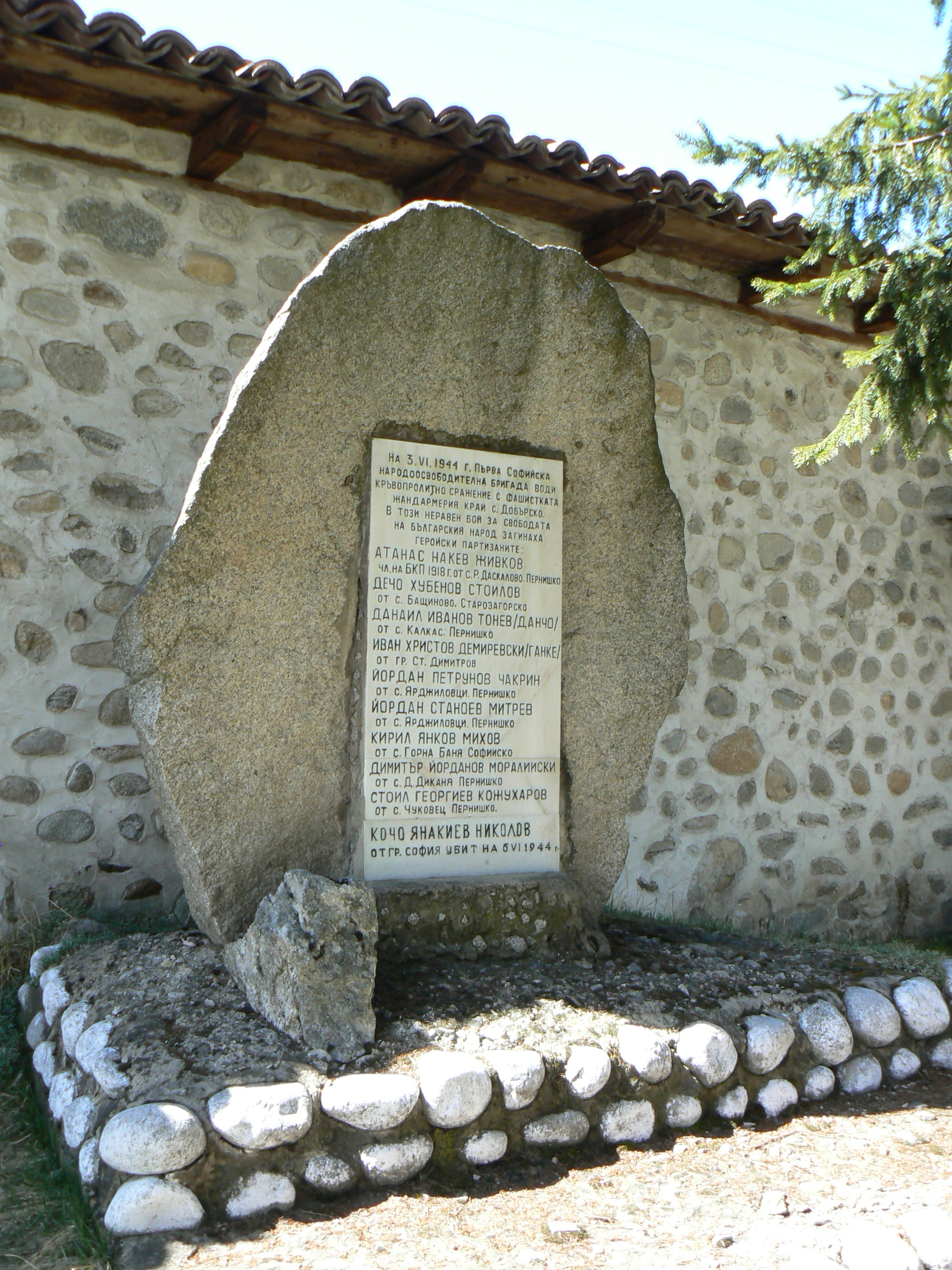
Partisans' monument
