= Bachevo =

Bachevo Бачево
- Village
- Location within Bulgaria
- Coordinates: 41°55′N 23°27′E
- Country: Bulgaria
- Province: Blagoevgrad Province
- Municipality: Razlog Municipality
- Cont. inhabited: since 7000 BC

Government
  - Mayor: Rositsa Chatlabasheva (GERB)

Area
  - Total: 66.22 km^{2} (25.57 sq mi)
- Highest elevation: 900 m (3,000 ft)
- Lowest elevation: 837 m (2,746 ft)

Population (31 December 2014)
  - Total: 1,638
  - Density: 24.74/km^{2} (64.07/sq mi)
- Time zone: UTC+2 (EET)
  - Summer (DST): UTC+3 (EEST)
- Postal code: 2769
- Area code: (+359) 07448

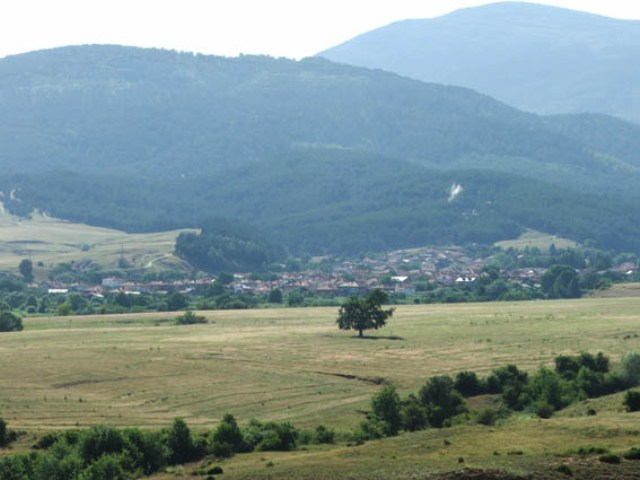
Bachevo

Village of Bachevo is located in South-Western planning region of Bulgaria. It is part of Razlog Municipality, Blagoevgrad Province. Situated at South-western Bulgaria in the Razlog Valley (6 km. north-western from Razlog town, 52 km. south-eastern from Blagoevgrad city, and 156 km. south from capital Sofia), the name Bacheva (Бачева in Bulgarian) is first mentioned in 1576 in the 8th register of the dzhelepkeshans (shepherd).
