= Unity Committee =

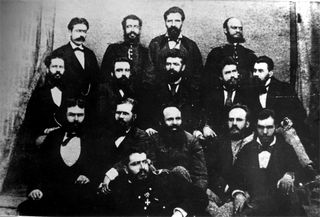
The first "Unity" Committee in Tarnovo.

The Unity Committee (Bulgarian: Единство Комитет, romanized: Edinstvo Komitet, Macedonian: Комитет Единство, romanized: Komitet Edinstvo) was an organization supporting the Bulgarian population of Thrace and Macedonia, remained within the Ottoman Empire after the division of the San Stefano Bulgaria and the decision of the Berlin Treaty. First Committee "Unity" was established on August 29, 1878, in Veliko Tarnovo. Its main objective was enshrined in the Constitutive protocol: Unity of all Bulgarians and their wellness today. The initiative for this belonged to Lyuben Karavelov, Stefan Stambolov and Hristo Ivanov - Golemia. The goal of this new committee was to create such committees around the country of Bulgaria. Soon after Edinstvo was formed in Tarnovo, steps were taken to spread it to all towns in Bulgaria and Eastern Rumelia as well. People were also sent to Macedonia. As a consequence the Kresna-Razlog Uprising was organized.
