= Razlovci uprising =

1876 Bulgarian rebellion

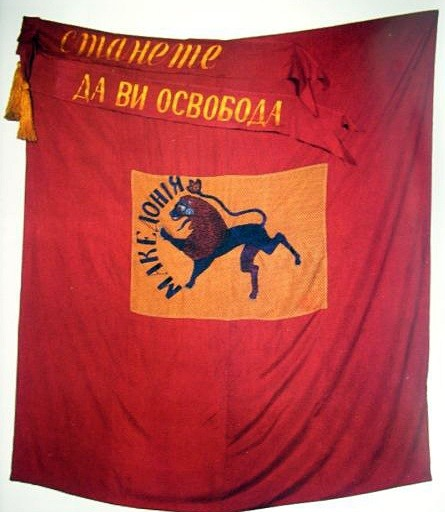
The insurgents' banner which states "Awaken to liberate you" (Bulgarian: СТАНЕТЕ ДА ВИ ОСВОБОДА, romanized: Stanete da vi osvoboda) and "Macedonia" (МАКЕДОНІЯ). It was made on the order of Berovski.

The Razlovci uprising (Bulgarian: Разловско въстание, romanized: Razlovsko vastanie; Macedonian: Разловечко востание, romanized: Razlovečko vostanie) was a Macedonian Bulgarian rebellion in the areas of Maleševo and Pijanec in Ottoman Macedonia.

The work on its preparation began in late 1875 in Thessaloniki. A revolutionary group was created there, that took a decision to organize an anti-Ottoman insurrection. This group consisted of activists of the Association "Bulgarian Dawn". The leader of the group was Dimitar Popgeorgiev - Berovski. In March 1876, Father Gennady, a courier of the Bulgarian Revolutionary Central Committee, met with the conspirators in Thessaloniki. He informed them of the preparations for the April Uprising, which was scheduled to break out in May.

The preparations for the rebellion began in late 1875 in the village of Razlovci, guided by Dimitar Berovski and Stoyan Razlovski. Nedelya Petkova and her daughter sewed the flag of the uprising. She also founded the society "Bulgarian dawn" which became the nucleus of the rebellion. It was planned that the rebellion would cover Maleševo, Radoviš, Strumica, Petrich, Melnik and later the Osogovo. Due to betrayal, the planned for May Bulgarian uprising, broke out in late April and therefore it was subsequently called the April Uprising.

After its outbreak, a number of arrests were made by the Ottoman authorities in Razlovci area. Because of this, the revolt broke out prematurely on May 7 (May 19 in Gregorian), in Razlovci. Two revolutionary bands of about 60 people got the village for a short time, and then the rebellion spread in Malеševo and Pijanec. However, the revolt was suppressed, and many of the rebels were killed or arrested. One of the chief organizers, priest Stoyan Razlovski, managed to withdraw to the Rila Monastery, where, to protect the monastic brotherhood, he committed suicide. The survivors escaped into the Maleševo Mountains, but no further action was possible.

According to Bulgarian historians, although the rebellion was prepared independently and had no direct organisational connection with the April Uprising, it is considered part of it. This view is also supported by the Norwegian historian Vemund Aarbakke, per whom the Macedonian historians baseless challenge its Bulgarian character. A distinct Macedonian national identity was not developed at that time, while the designation "Macedonian" had mostly a regional meaning. According to Macedonian historians, the uprising had Macedonian national and political goals - to intensify and turn the attention of European powers to bring diplomatic intervention on Macedonia's behalf and it had no direct relation to the April uprising. Per academic Blaže Ristovski, the uprising had a Macedonian national-liberation character and was connected with April Uprising and Herzegovina Uprising and some of the Great Powers. According to the leader Dimitar Popgeorgiev, the rebellion was organised to provide support for the Herzegovina Uprising.

== See also ==
- Constantinople Conference
