= Dolno Draglishte =

- Village
- Location within Bulgaria
- Coordinates: 41°56′N 23°31′E
- Country: Bulgaria
- Province: Blagoevgrad Province
- Municipality: Razlog Municipality
- Time zone: UTC+2 (EET)
  - Summer (DST): UTC+3 (EEST)

Dolno Draglishte is a village in Razlog Municipality, in Blagoevgrad Province, Bulgaria.
