= Godlevo =

Godlevo Godlevo
- Village
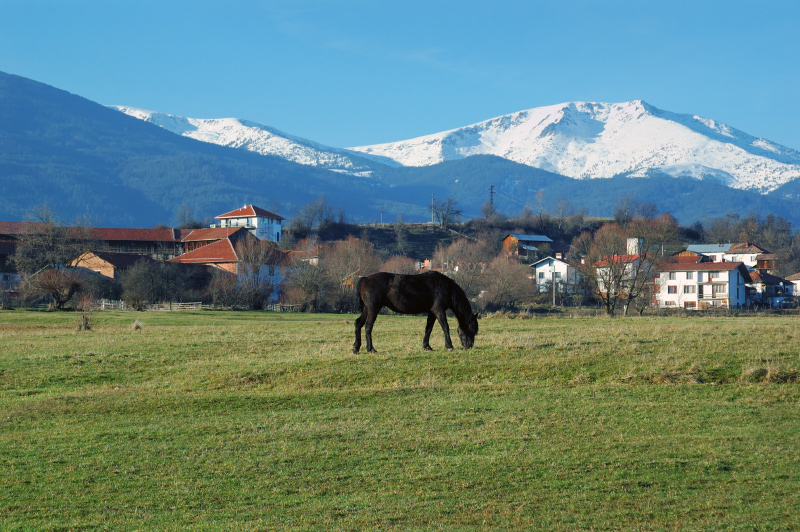

- Location within Bulgaria
- Coordinates: 41°56′N 23°29′E
- Country: Bulgaria
- Province: Blagoevgrad Province
- Municipality: Razlog Municipality

Population (2012)
  - Total: 500
- Time zone: UTC+2 (EET)
  - Summer (DST): UTC+3 (EEST)

Godlevo is a village in Razlog Municipality, in Blagoevgrad Province, Bulgaria. Godlevo is 12 kilometers from Bansko, 6 kilometers from Pirin Golf Country Club, 10 kilometers from Semkovo (ski center), and 140 kilometers from Sofia. Godlevo has its own stadium with capacity for 2000 people.

== Hotels ==
Godlevo has three hotels: Pripetzite, K2 Hotel| and Assen House.
