= Gorno Draglishte =

- Village
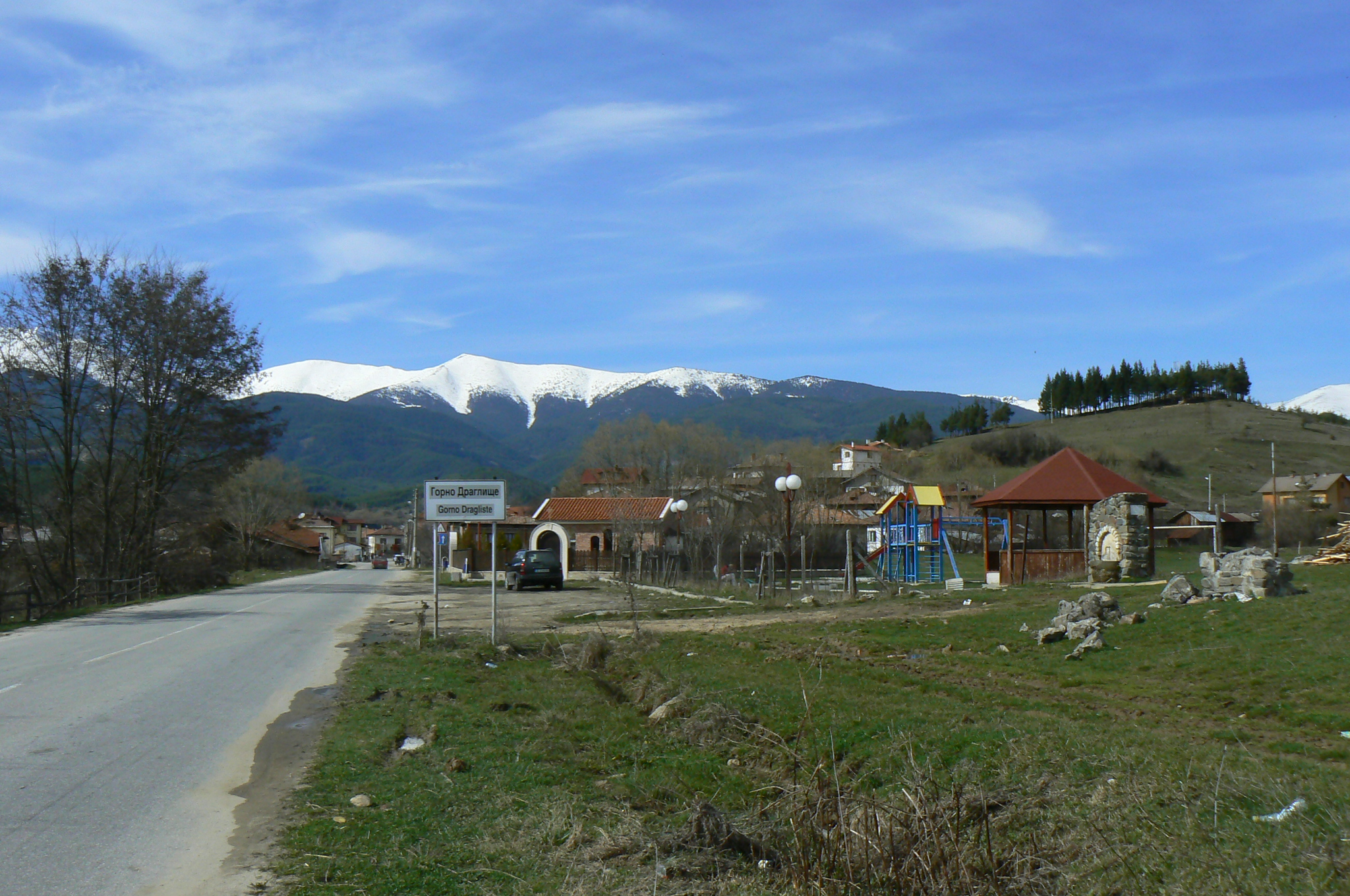
- Road sign in Gorno Dragslishte

- Location within Bulgaria
- Coordinates: 41°57′N 23°31′E
- Country: Bulgaria
- Province: Blagoevgrad Province
- Municipality: Razlog Municipality
- Time zone: UTC+2 (EET)
  - Summer (DST): UTC+3 (EEST)

Gorno Draglishte is a village in Razlog Municipality, in Blagoevgrad Province, Bulgaria.

This small mountain village at the foot of the Rila Mountain is surrounded by the Pirin and the Rhodopes. Gorno Draglishte is becoming a tourist attraction for both Bulgarians and foreigners. Nowadays it has a population of approximately 1,000 people. According to the earliest written evidence, the village exists at least since 1576 CE.
