= Razlog Municipality =

Coordinates: 41°53′N 23°28′E

Razlog Municipality Община Разлог
- Municipality
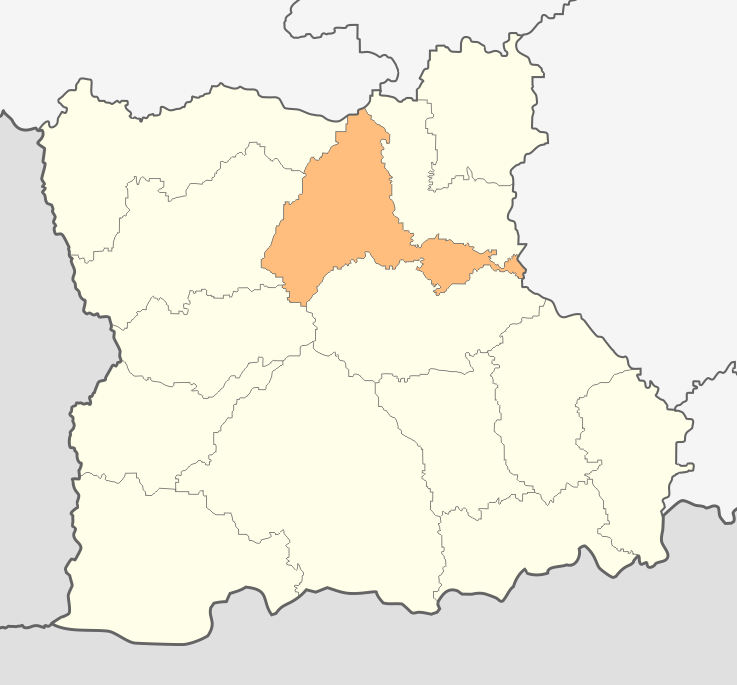
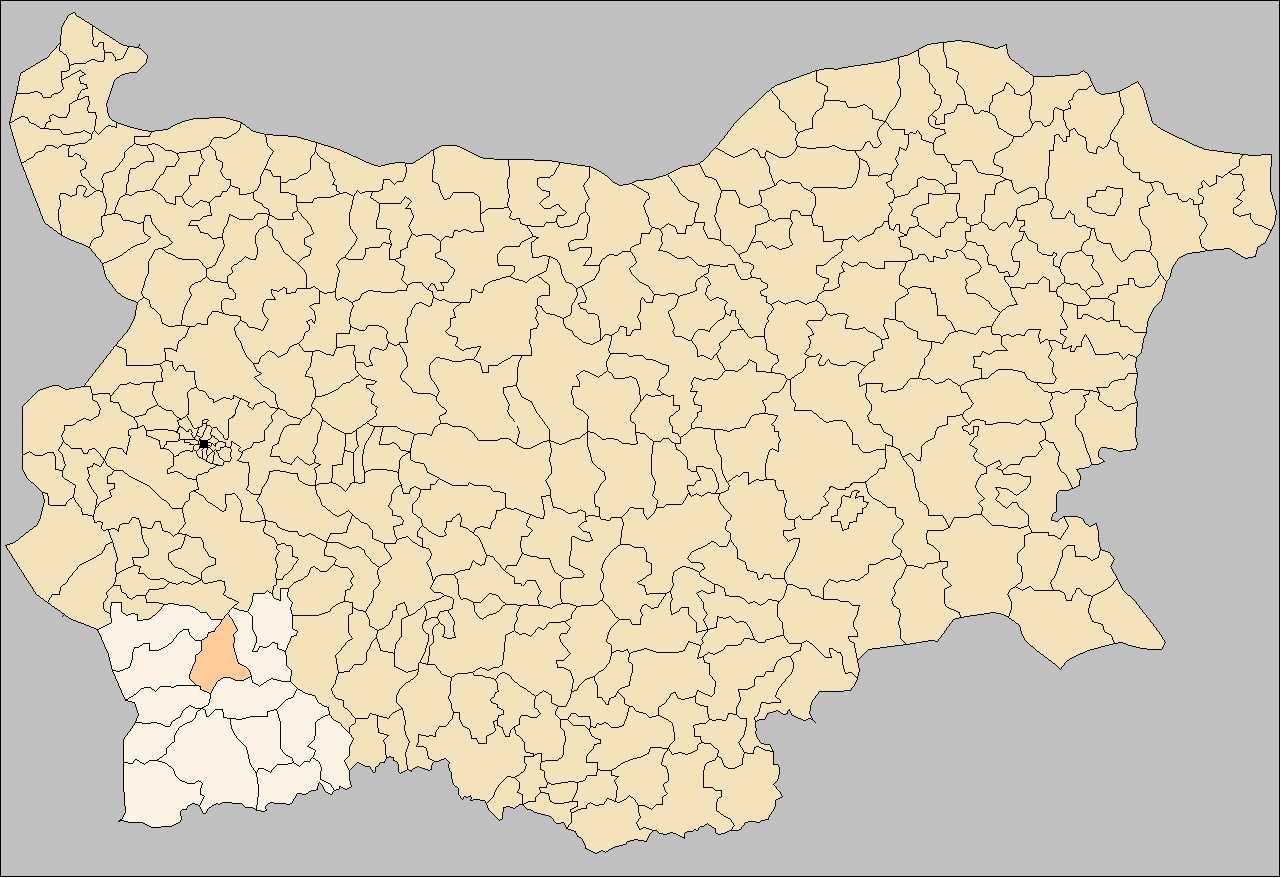
- Location in Blagoevgrad province Location on map of Bulgaria
- Country: Bulgaria
- Province (Oblast): Blagoevgrad

Area
  - Total: 506.47 km^{2} (195.55 sq mi)

Population
  - Total: 21,495
  - Density: 42.441/km^{2} (109.92/sq mi)

Razlog Municipality is located in Blagoevgrad Province, Bulgaria. It has 22,124 inhabitants.

The town of Razlog is the administrative centre.

Places include:

- Bachevo
- Banya
- Dobarsko
- Dolno Draglishte
- Eleshnitsa
- Godlevo
- Gorno Draglishte
- Razlog

== Demographics ==
=== Religion ===
According to the latest Bulgarian census of 2011, the religious composition, among those who answered the optional question on religious identification, was the following:

Religious composition of Razlog Municipality
Orthodox Christianity	90.27%
Catholicism	0.29%
Protestantism	1.64%
Islam	0.28%
No religion	2.06%
Prefer not to answer, others and indefinable	5.46%
