= Dimitar Popgeorgiev =

Bulgarian revolutionary (1840–1907)

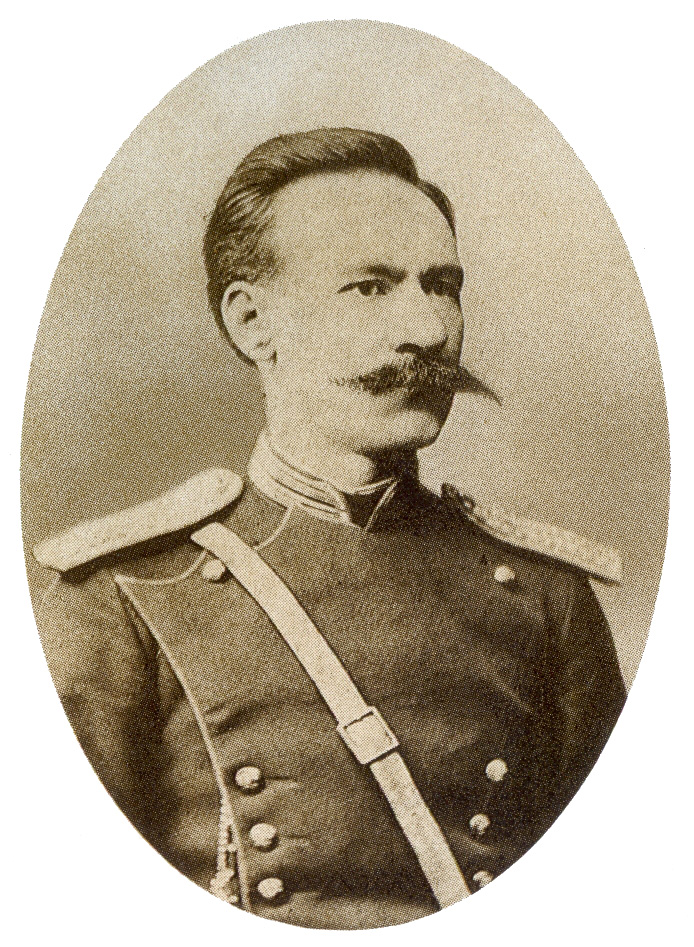
Berovski as Bulgarian officer

Dimitar Popgeorgiev Berovski (Bulgarian: Димитър Попгеоргиев Беровски, Macedonian: Димитар Поп-Георгиев Беровски, 1840 – 1907) was a Bulgarian revolutionary from Ottoman Macedonia. He was one of the leaders of the Razlovci uprising and Kresna-Razlog Uprising.

== Biography ==
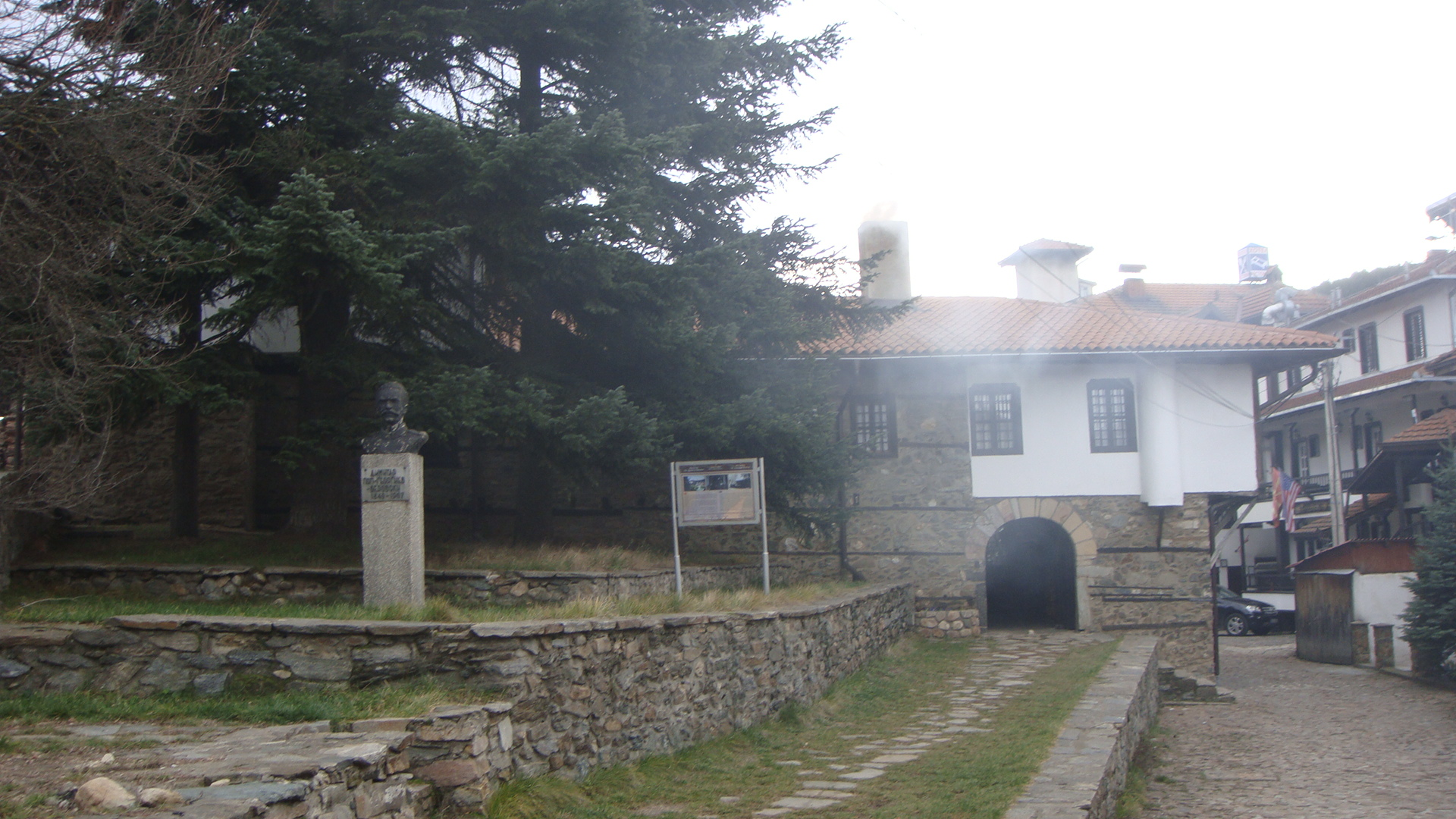
Bust of Berovski in his native Berovo.

He was born on 1840 in Berovo, Ottoman Empire (present-day North Macedonia). He studied in Odessa where he met the Bulgarian revolutionary Georgi Sava Rakovski and fell under his influence. Later Berovski participated in his Bulgarian Legion in Belgrade. Then he worked as a Bulgarian teacher in Macedonia. For his anti-Greek Orthodox Church policy Berovski was jailed. For a brief period, he became an adherent of the Bulgarian Greek Catholic Church. Later he moved to Constantinople and became one of the activists of the newly established Bulgarian Exarchate. In 1875, Berovski was among the leaders of the Association "Bulgarian Dawn" in Thessaloniki. During thе period of 1863 to 1876, Popgeorgiev maintained correspondence with Stefan Verković. In 1876 Berovski was one of the leaders of Razlovci uprising. In an encounter with the Ottomans, he was wounded, but managed to escape to the Maleševo Mountains, after the uprising was suppressed. He also participated in the Russo-Turkish War (1877–1878) and later was one of the leaders of the Kresna-Razlog Uprising. At that time he was authorized to went to Constituent Bulgarian Parliament appealing versus the signing of the Treaty of Berlin and in maintenance of unification of Bulgaria and Macedonia, representing Macedonian Bulgarians on its first session.

After the failure of the uprising, he moved in Principality of Bulgaria and worked as a Bulgarian police officer and district governor. in Kyustendil, Tsaribrod and Radomir. Berovski took part in the unification of Bulgaria and Eastern Rumelia and in the Serbo-Bulgarian War in 1885. In 1884, he retired to the village of Dolna Grashtitsa, Kyustendil region, where he purchased a farm and engaged in agriculture. Later during the 1890s he was member and for a period president of the Kyustendil Macedonian Society which supported the Supreme Macedonian-Adrianople Committee (SMAC). Later, his house became a border post of the Internal Macedonian Revolutionary Organization for the transfer of revolutionaries to the Ottoman Empire. For a short time in 1902, Popgeorgiev served as mayor of Kyustendil. He died in Kyustendil in 1907. His son Stanimir Berovski was a public figure and regional governor of Kyustendil district from the Bulgarian Progressive Liberal Party. Some of his personal belongings are kept in the monastery "St Archangel Michael" which serves as the city museum of Berovo.

== See also ==
- National awakening of Bulgaria

== Literature ==
- "Възвание към българските граждани", Кюстендил, 25 ноември 1897 година - After the Vinitsa affair, Dimitar Popgeorgiev issues a proclamation to the Bulgarian people, 1897.
