= Momina Klisura (Mesta) =

- Момина клисура
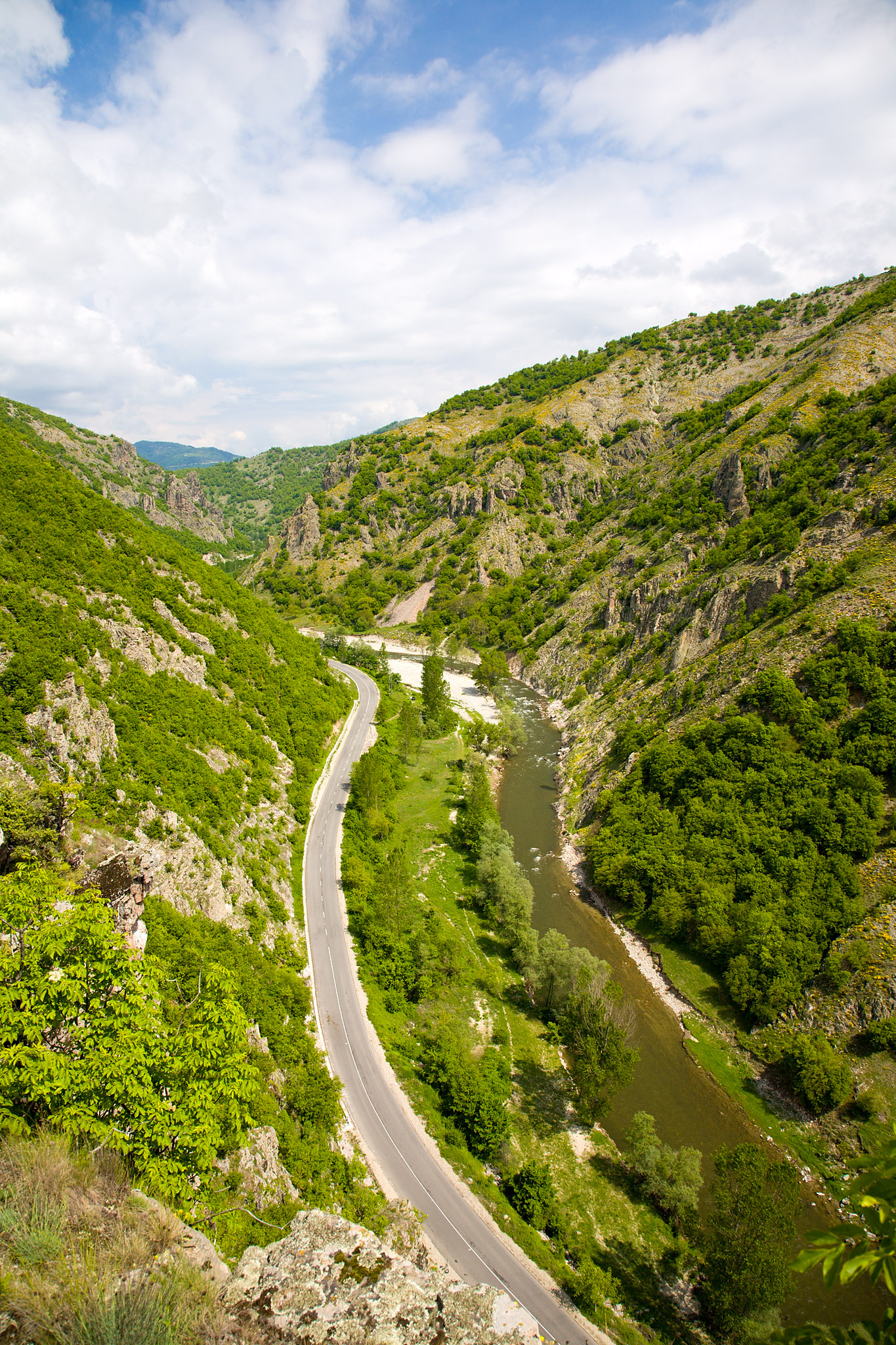
- Mesta River at Momina Klisura

- Location within Bulgaria
- Floor elevation: 642 m (2,106 ft)
- Length: 25 kilometres (82,000 ft) north to south

Geology
- Type: Gorge

Geography
- Location: Pirin and Rhodope Mountains, Bulgaria
- Coordinates: 41°43′29″N 23°41′31″E
- Interactive map of Momina Klisura

Momina Klisura (Bulgarian: Момина клисура, meaning Maiden's Gorge) is a steep valley along the river Mesta in south-western Bulgaria, stretching about 25 km. Administratively, it is situated in the municipalities of Bansko and Gotse Delchev, Blagoevgrad Province. According to the legend, the gorge was named after a maiden, who fought the Ottoman Turks defending the fortress of Momina Kula and plunged into the abyss upon seeing that the stronghold was about to fall.

== Geography ==
Momina Klisura forms the divide between the Pirin Mountains in the west and the westernmost ridge of the Rhodope Mountains, Dabrash, in the east. It links the south-easternmost part of the Razlog Valley in the north and the northernmost part of the Gotse Delchev Valley in the south. The gorge is about 25 km long with an average altitude of 642 m. It is narrow with steep slopes dug into metamorphic rocks, late Triassic sediment and vulcanite. The river Retizhe, a right tributary of the Mesta, flows into its main course at Momina Klisura.

The gorge takes its beginning east of the town of Dobrinishte, at the confluence with Bezbog River at an altitude of 693 m and heads to the south and south-east. The middle section is in the area of the village of Mesta, where the altitude is 642 m. Momina Klisura ends to the south-east of the village of Gospodintsi in the Gotse Delchev Valley at an altitude of 544 m.

Along its length are located the villages of Filipovo, Mesta and Gospodintsi, as well as the ruins of the late antique and medieval fortress Momina Kula and another fortress near Gospodintsi.

A 27.4 km long section of the second class road II-19 between Simitli, Bansko, Gotse Delchev and Ilinden at the border with Greece follows the gorge.

== Gallery ==
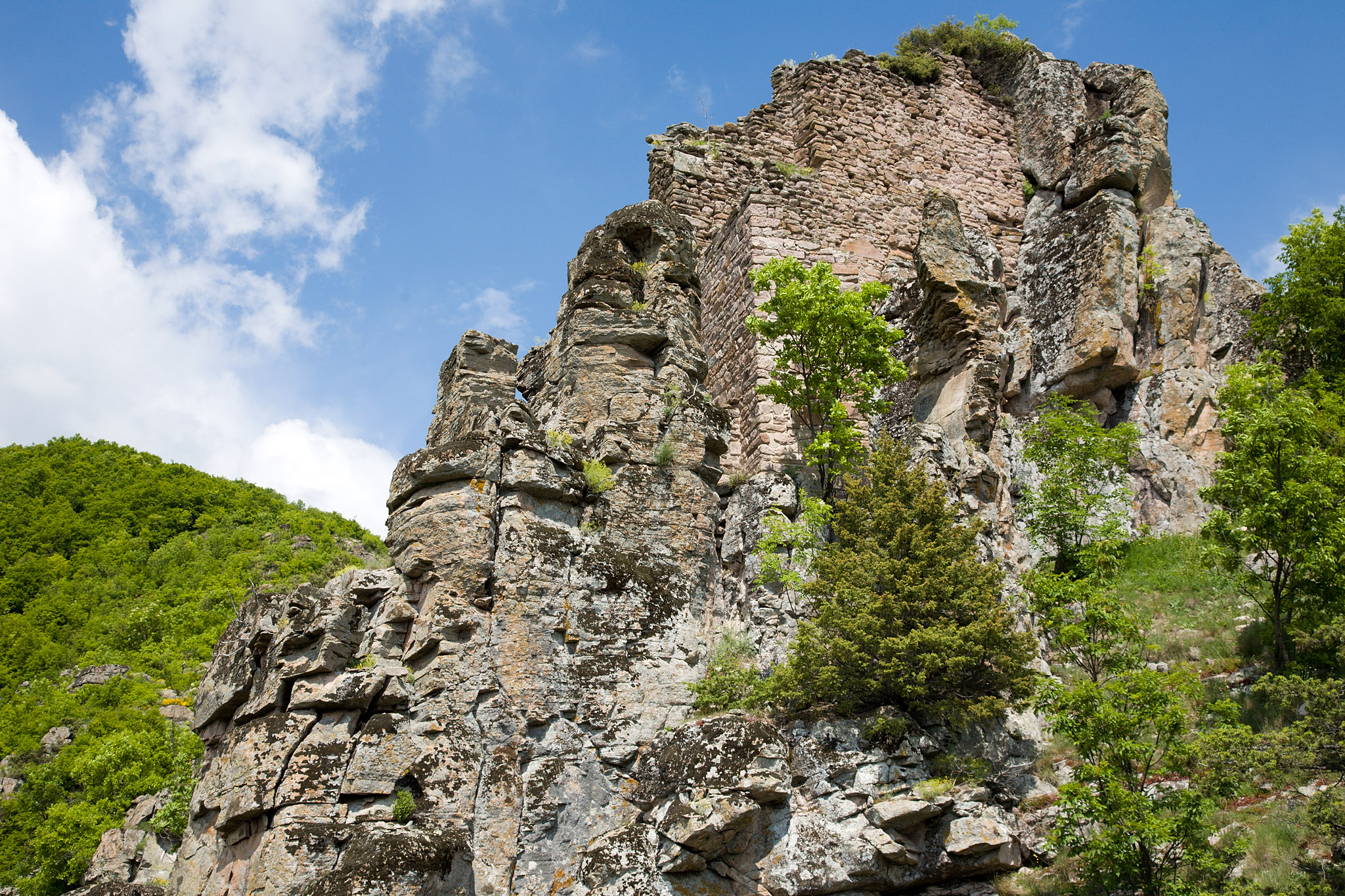
Momina Kula

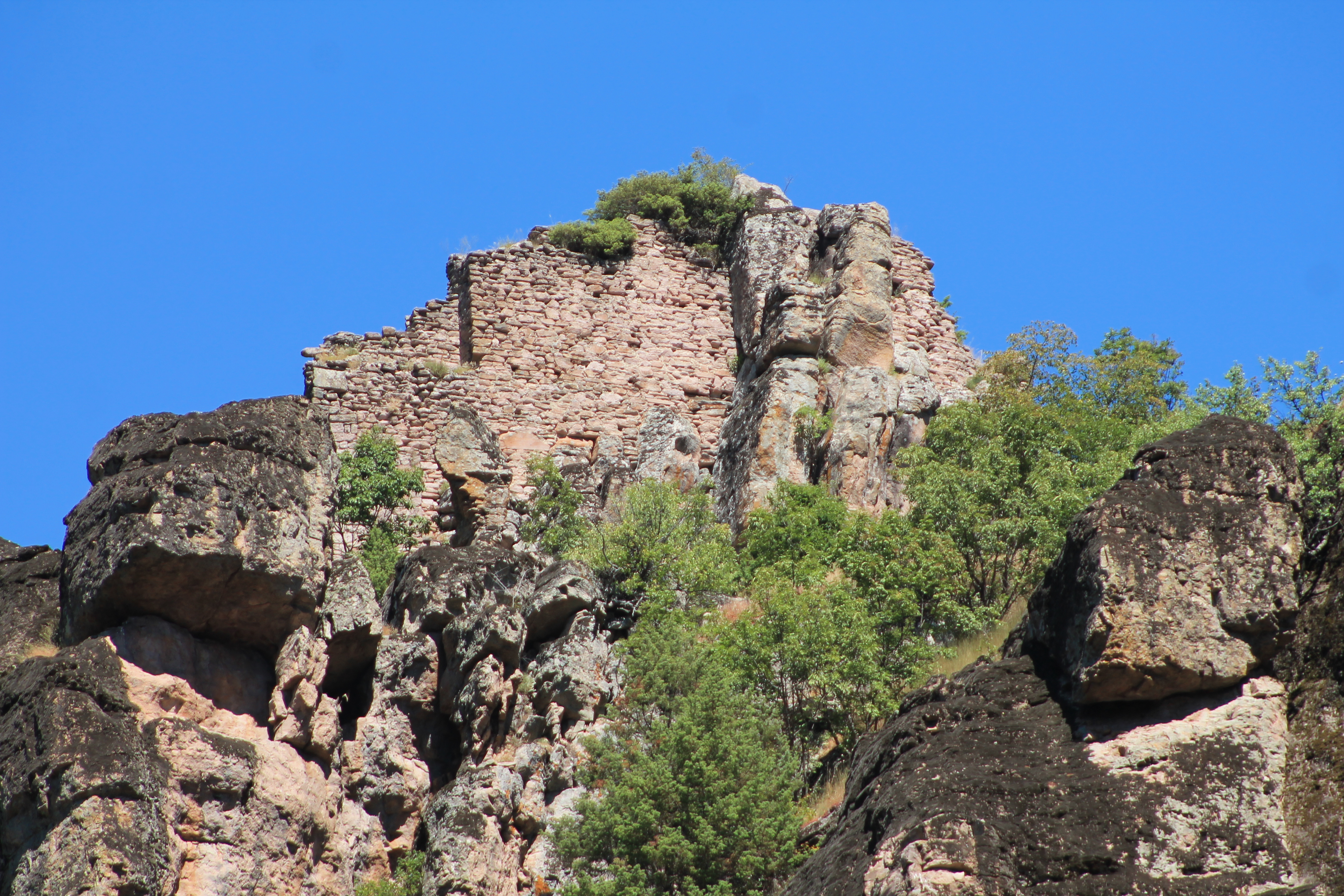
Momina Kula
