= Retizhe =

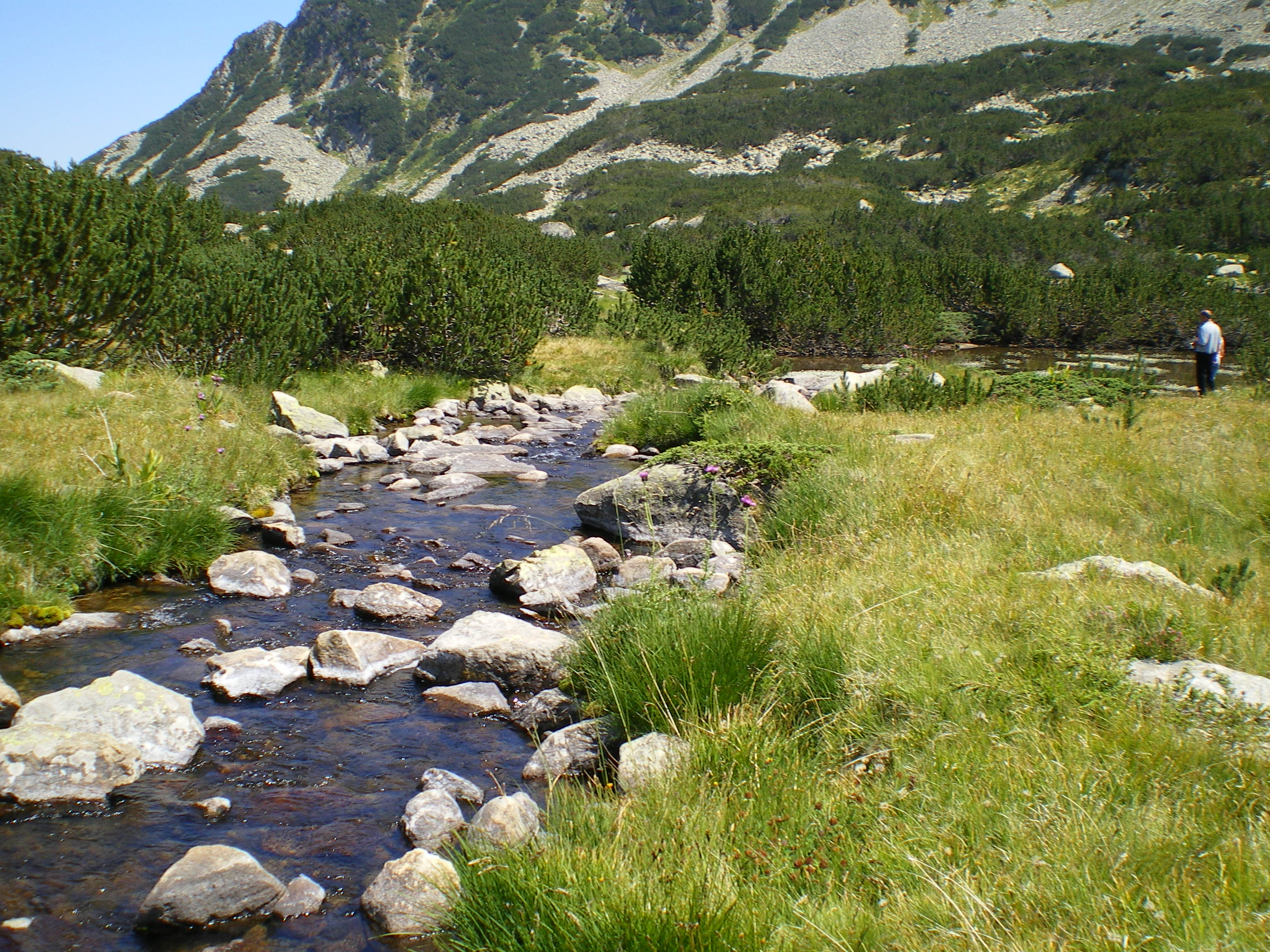
- The upper course of Retizhe

Location
- Country: Bulgaria

Physical characteristics
- Source
  - location: Popovo Lake, Pirin
  - elevation: 2,234 m (7,329 ft)
- Mouth
  - location: Nestos (Mesta)
  - coordinates: 41°45′32.04″N 23°40′33.96″E
  - elevation: 646 m (2,119 ft)
- Length: 19 km (12 mi)
- Basin size: 44 km^{2} (17 sq mi)

Basin features
- Progression: Nestos→ Aegean Sea

The Retizhe (Bulgarian: Ретиже) is a river in south-western Bulgaria, a right tributary of the Mesta. The river is 19 km long and drains parts of the eastern slopes of the Pirin mountain range.

The river takes its source from Pirin's largest and deepest glacial lake, Popovo, at an altitude of 2,234 m. At an altitude of 2,174 m near the Fish Popovi Lakes it is joined by two mountain streams — one from the north sloping down the summit of Polezhan (2,851 m), and one from the west coming from the Polezhanski Lakes. Further downstream another stream coming from the Kremenski Lakes flows into the Retizhe. It then flows in north-eastern direction in a deep valley, forming rapids and small waterfalls. Downstream the valley becomes deeper and is covered with dense forests. Some four kilometres before its mouth the Retizhe turns in eastern direction and forms a deep impassable canyon. It flows into the Mesta at Momina Klisura Gorge at an altitude of 646 m near the village of Mesta, Bansko Municipality. The village is the only settlement along the course of the river.

Its drainage basin covers a territory of 44 km² or 1.33% of Mesta's total. The main tributary is the Kremeshnitsa, which flows into the Retizhe close to its confluence with the Mesta. The river has predominantly snow-rain feed with high water in summer (June) and low water in winter (February). The average annual flow is 1.33 m^{3}/s.

Only a small part of the river's water resources are utilised for hydroelectricity. There are five small hydro power stations with a combined installed capacity of 10 MW. The river sustains large populations of brown trout.

== Honours ==
Retizhe Cove in Antarctica is named after the river.
