= Osenovo =

Osenovo may refer to:

- In Bulgaria (written in Cyrillic as Осеново):
  - Osenovo, Blagoevgrad Province - a town in the Bansko municipality, Blagoevgrad Province
  - Osenovo, Varna Province - a village in the Aksakovo municipality, Varna Province
  - One of two villages in the Simitli municipality, Blagoevgrad Province
    - Dolno Osenovo or Lower Osenovo (Долно Осеново)
    - Gorno Osenovo or Upper Osenovo (Горно Осеново)
