= Apostolov =

Apostolov is the name of:

- Atanas Apostolov (born 1989), Bulgarian footballer
- Boban Apostolov (born 1984), Macedonian songwriter and record producer
- Ivan Apostolov (1847–1926), Bulgarian haydut and revolutionary
- Mihail Apostolov (1871–1902), Bulgarian officer and member of the Internal Macedonian-Adrianople Revolutionary Organization
- Risto Apostolov, Macedonian musician, songwriter and record producer
- Rumen Apostolov (born 1963), Bulgarian footballer
- Vidin Apostolov (1941–2020), Bulgarian footballer
- Viktor Apostolov (1962–2011), Bulgarian hammer thrower
- Yordan Apostolov (born 1989), Bulgarian footballer
