= Gostun, Bulgaria =

Gostun Гостун
- Village
- Location within Bulgaria
- Coordinates: 41°48′N 23°41′E
- Country: Bulgaria
- Province: Blagoevgrad Province
- Municipality: Bansko

Government
  - Suffragan Mayor: Iliya Belev

Area
  - Total: 52,425 km^{2} (20,241 sq mi)
- Elevation: 1,028 m (3,373 ft)

Population (15-12-2010)
  - Total: 69
- GRAO
- Time zone: UTC+2 (EET)
  - Summer (DST): UTC+3 (EEST)
- Postal Code: 2773
- Area code: 074409

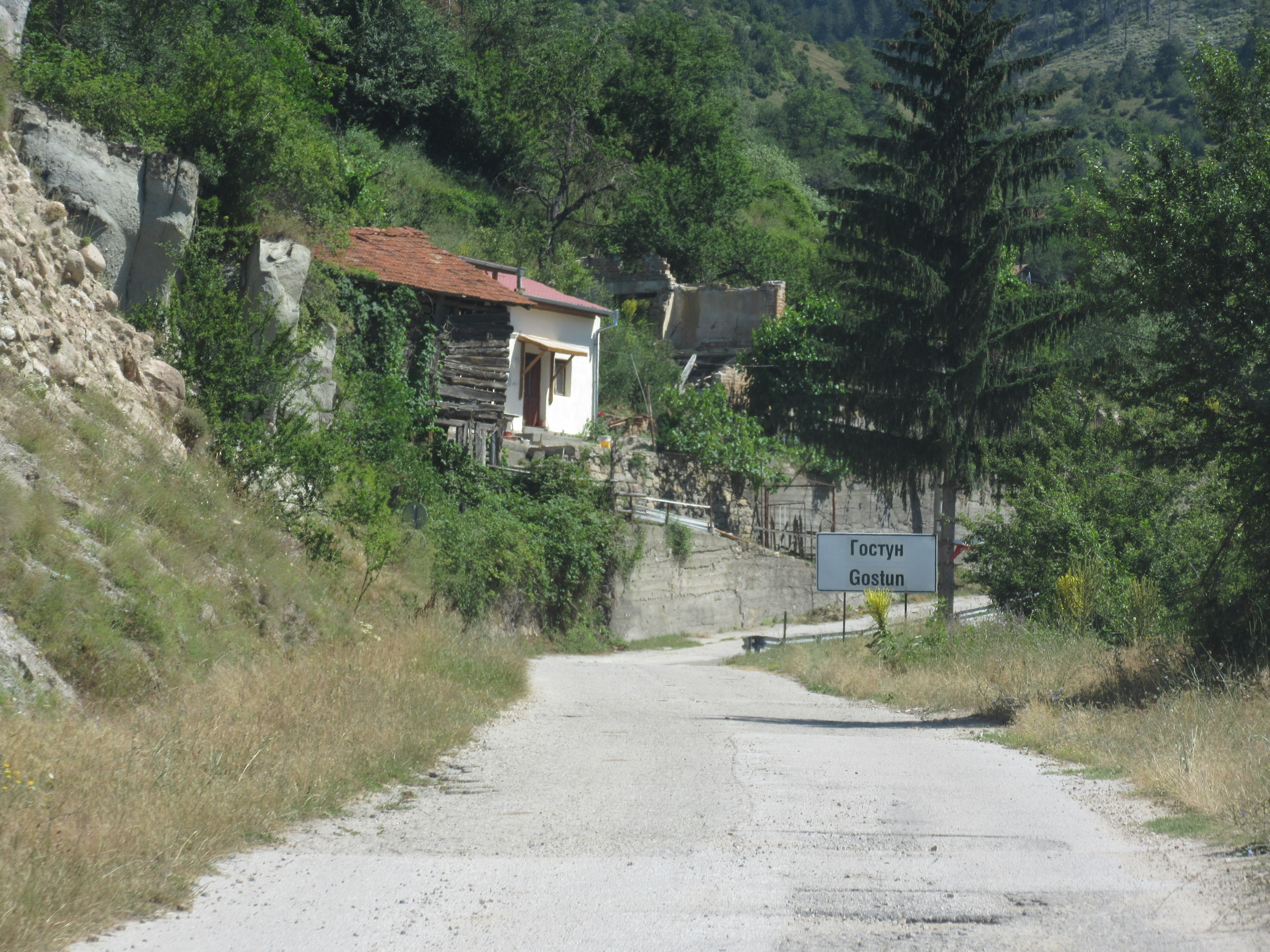
Gostun village entrance road, Bulgaria

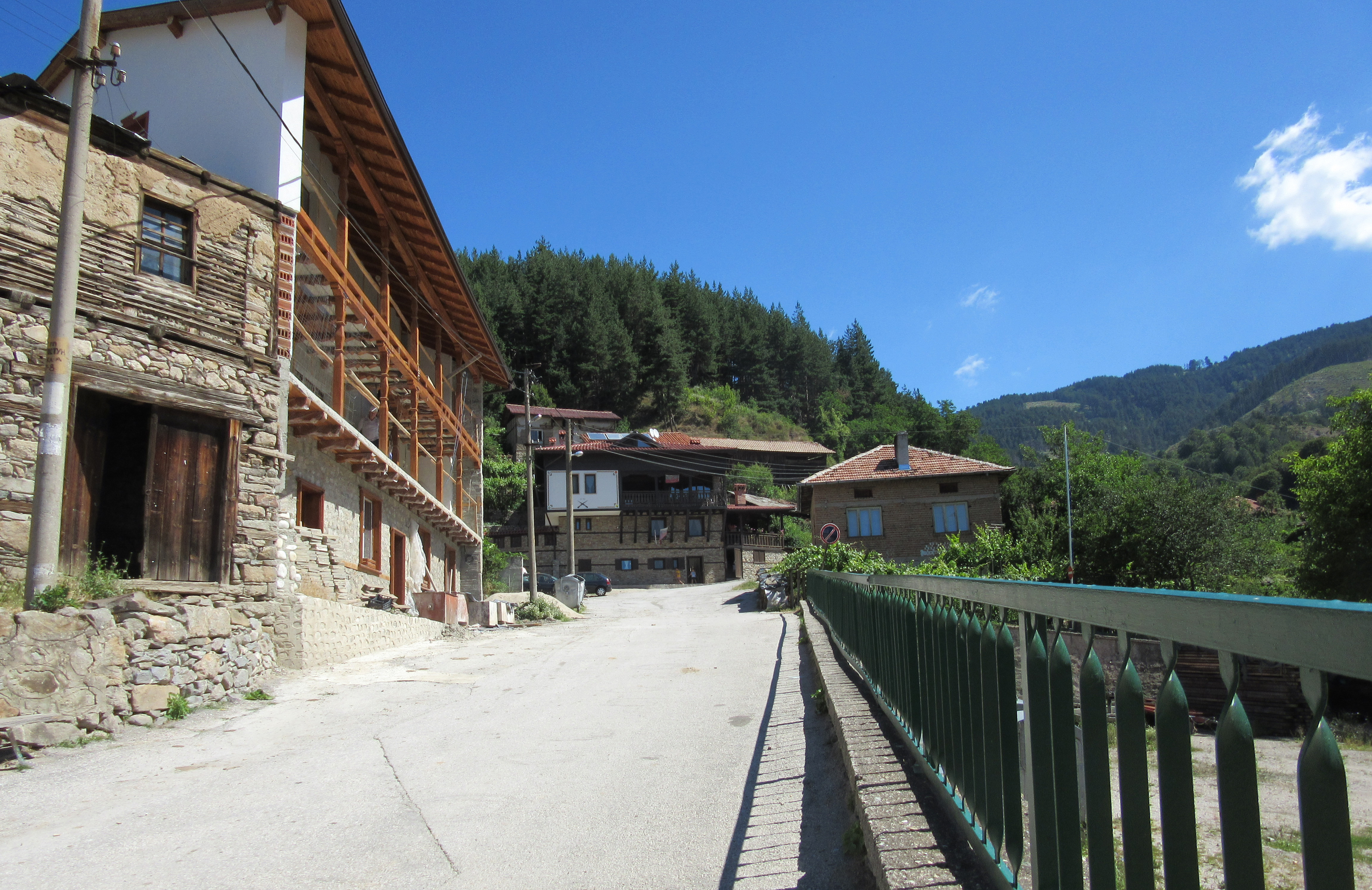
View of Gostun village central square

Gostun (Bulgarian: Гостун) is a village (село) in southwestern Bulgaria, located in the Bansko Municipality (Община Банско) of the Blagoevgrad Province (област Благоевград). It is located on the eastern slopes of the Rhodope Mountains, east of Mesta river 17 kilometers southeast of Bansko, 54 kilometers southeast of Blagoevgrad and 103 kilometers southeast of Sofia.

Gostun is the birthplace of Ivan Lebanov - the first Bulgarian to win a Winter Olympic medal in 1980.
