= Kremenski Lakes =

Group of lakes in southwestern Bulgaria

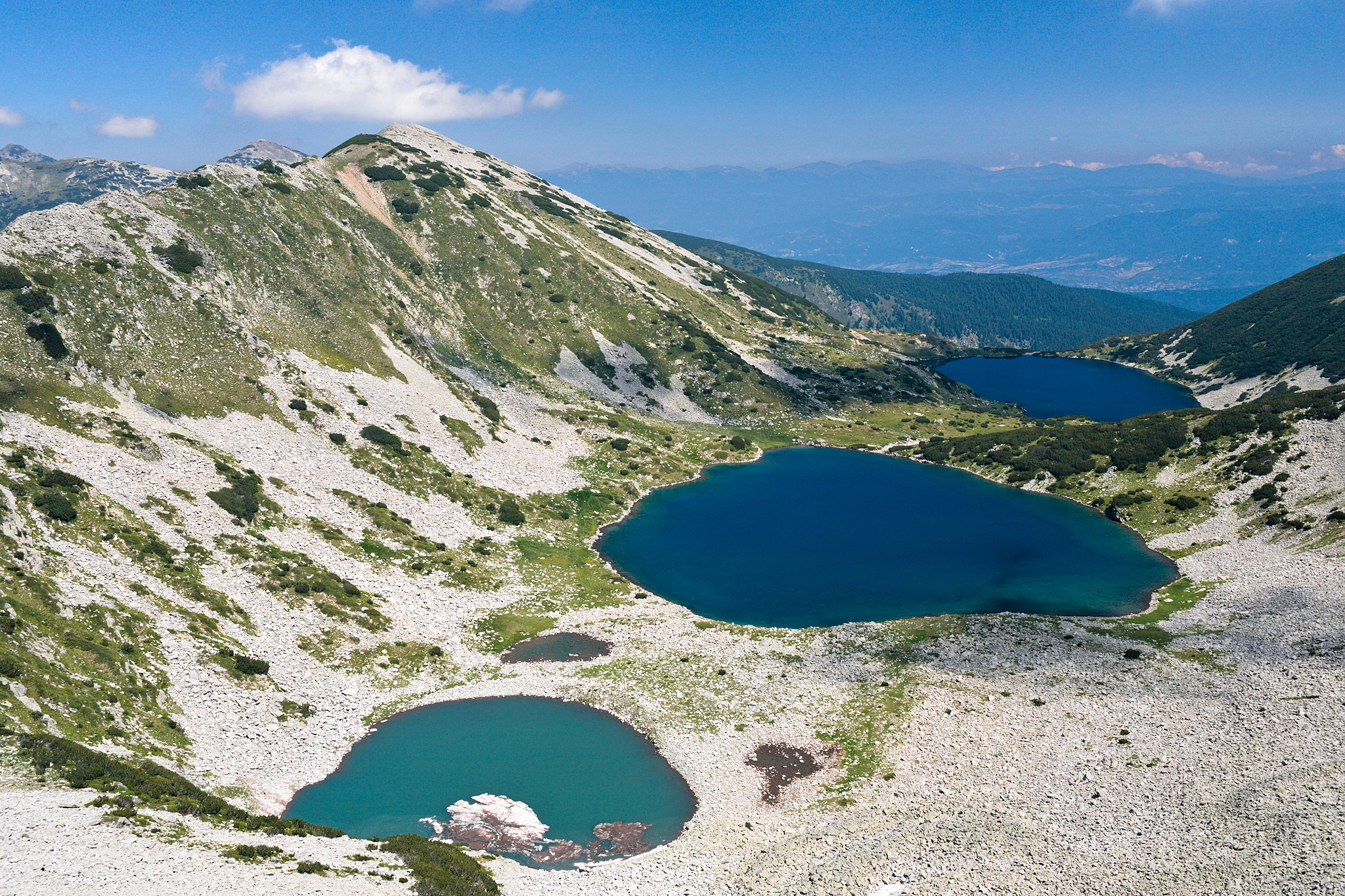

- Location within Bulgaria
- Coordinates: 41°41′49″N 23°31′07″E
- Basin countries: Bulgaria
- Average depth: 27 m (89 ft)
- Surface elevation: 2,139 m (7,018 ft) to 2,359 m (7,740 ft)

Kremenski Lakes (Bulgarian: Кременски езера) are a glacial lake group in the Pirin mountain range, southwestern Bulgaria. They are located in the Pirin National Park, a UNESCO World Heritage Site. The group consists of nine lakes, seven permanent and two drying, in the narrow salient Kremenski cirque. Kremenski Lakes are surrounded by the summits of Sivria (2,591 m) to the northwest and Dzhano (2,668 m) to the southeast, as well as the Kremenski ridge which ends with Kremenski peak (2,503 m). They drain into the river Retizhe, a right tributary of the Mesta.

== Lakes ==
Kremenski Lakes is the largest lake group in Pirin, with a total area of 196,000 m^{2} and a combined volume of 1,560,000 m^{3}. Two of the lakes are the second and the fourth largest by area, as well as third and fifth by depth in the mountain range.

The Icy Lake is the uppermost at an altitude of 2,359 m. It is small round-shaped with length of 120 m, width of 110 m and area of 10,000 m^{2}. The next two lakes are the largest.

The Upper Kremen Lake is located 700 m south-southwest of the summit of Sivria at an altitude of 2,357 m. The lake has length of 335 m, width of 270 m, with an area varying between 66,100 m^{2} and 70,000 m^{2}. It is 13.9 m deep and a considerable volume of water estimated at 478,000 m^{3}.

The Lower Kremen Lake is located 725 m east of Sivria at an altitude of 2,306 m and is the largest in the group and the second largest in Pirin, after the Popovo Lake. The lake has elongated shape with length of 500 m and width of 275 m. The area is between 98,000 m^{2} and 100,000 m^{2}. Reaching depth of 27 m, it is the third deepest in the mountain range, following Popovo Lake and the Tevno Vasilashko Lake. Its water volume is 1,000,000 m^{3}.

Further downhill there are six more small lakes, some of them larger than the Icy Lake, that are poorly researched. Two of them dry out in summer.

The main tourist routes in the area circumvent the Kremenski cirque and its lakes, which make them relatively less known to tourists. The lakes are most easily reached from the valley of the river Retizhe and the summit of Dzhano. There are two trails from there, both leading to the two lowermost Kremenski Lakes at an altitude of 2,140 m.

== Gallery ==
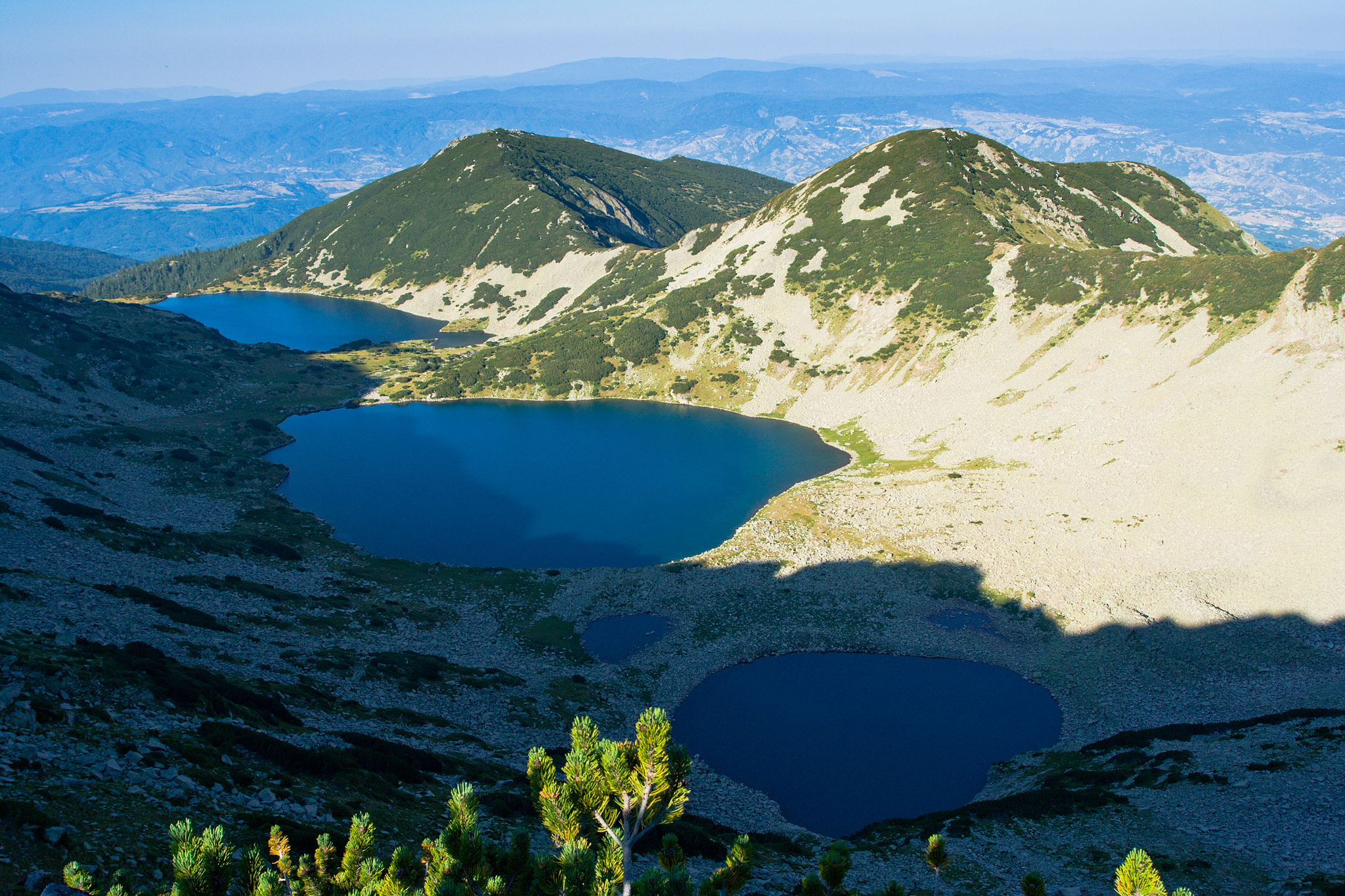

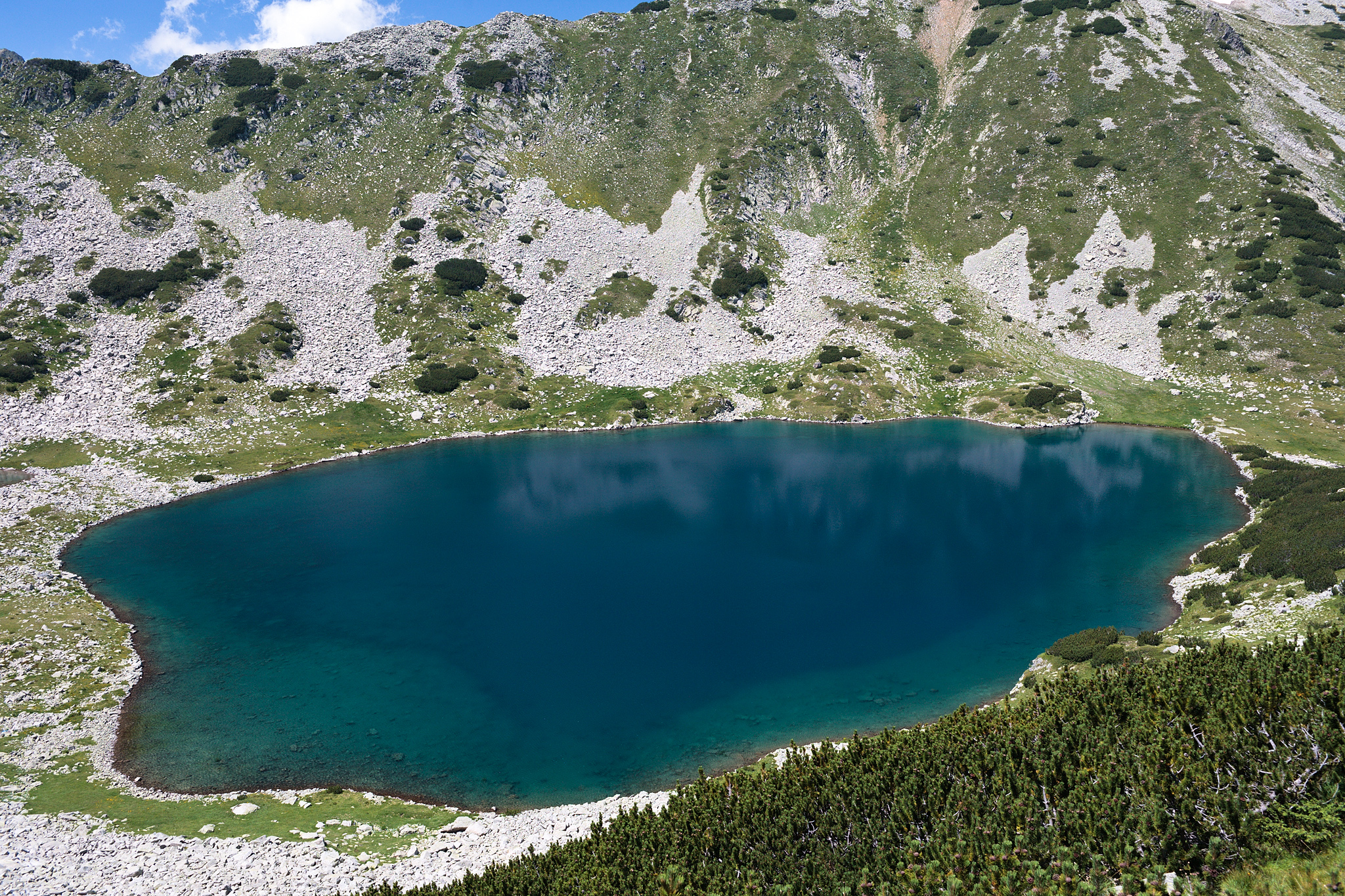

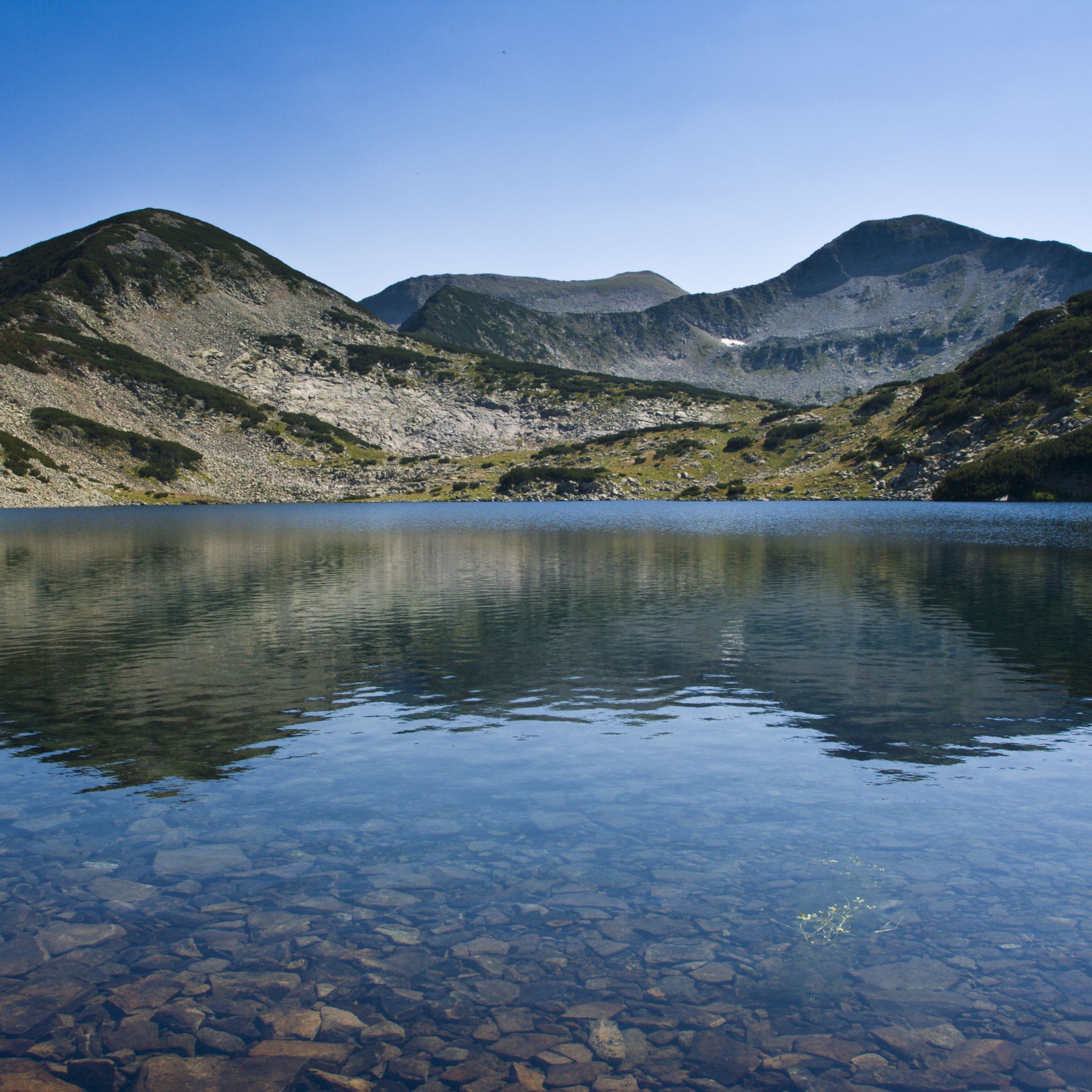

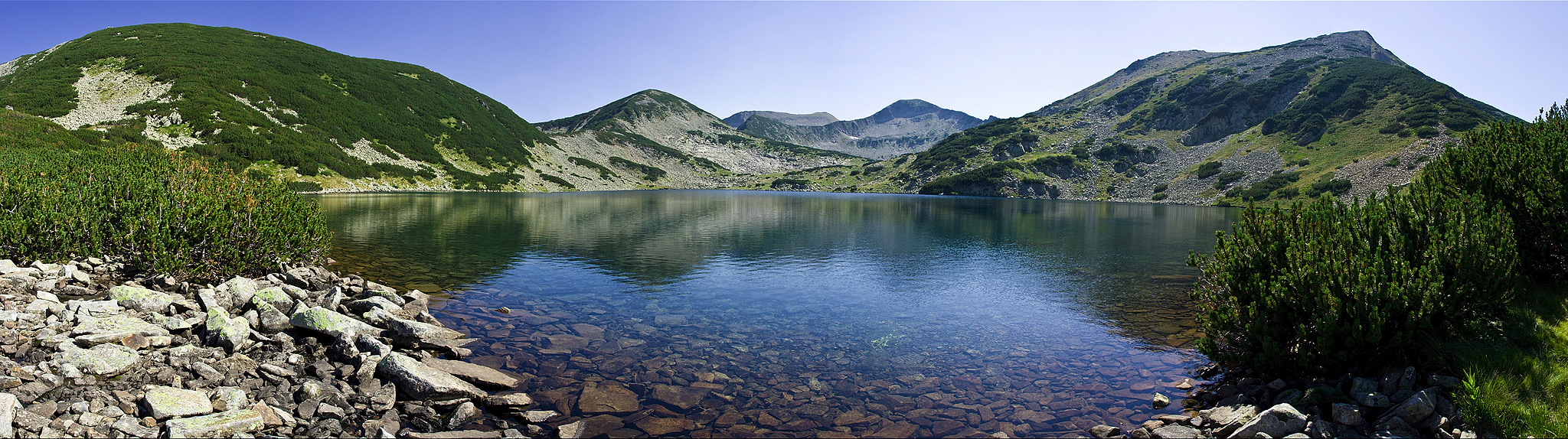
