= Osenovo, Blagoevgrad Province =

Osenovo Осеново
- Village
- Location within Bulgaria
- Coordinates: 41°47′N 23°44′E
- Country: Bulgaria
- Province: Blagoevgrad Province
- Municipality: Bansko

Government
  - Suffragan Mayor: Georgi Chipilev

Area
  - Total: 52,832 km^{2} (20,399 sq mi)
- Elevation: 1,262 m (4,140 ft)

Population (15-12-2010)
  - Total: 74
- GRAO
- Time zone: UTC+2 (EET)
  - Summer (DST): UTC+3 (EEST)
- Postal Code: 2774
- Area code: 074409

Osenovo (Bulgarian: Осеново) is a village (село) in southwestern Bulgaria, located in the Bansko Municipality of the Blagoevgrad Province in the western part of Rhodope Mountains. It is situated on the slope of a small river valley 21 kilometers southeast of Bansko and 59 kilometers southeast of Blagoevgrad. The village can be accessed by a steep paved mountainous road from the village of Mesta via Filipovo. The road passes by an interesting rock formation named "The Wedding" (Bulgarian: Сватбата). There are also other interesting rocks near the village. The same road reaches the forestry shall "Vishteritsa" high in the mountain 11 kilometers east from the village. In the end of the 19th century the village moved 6-7 kilometers south-east from a higher place, where it had been found more than a century before.
