= Kremen, Blagoevgrad Province =

Kremen Кремен
- Village
- Location within Bulgaria
- Coordinates: 41°45′N 23°39′E
- Country: Bulgaria
- Province: Blagoevgrad Province
- Municipality: Bansko

Government
  - Mayor: Dimitar Tsukov (NDSV)

Area
  - Total: 61,869 km^{2} (23,888 sq mi)
- Elevation: 1,100 m (3,600 ft)

Population (15-09-2023)
  - Total: 134
- GRAO
- Time zone: UTC+2 (EET)
  - Summer (DST): UTC+3 (EEST)
- Postal Code: 2771
- Area code: 074407

Kremen (Bulgarian: Кремен) is a mountainous village in southwestern Bulgaria in the Bansko Municipality of the Blagoevgrad Province. It is situated on the eastern slopes of Pirin 16 kilometers southeast of Bansko and 54 kilometers southeast of Blagoevgrad. The village is 6 kilometers away from the secondary international road 19 Blagoevgrad-Bansko-Gotse Delchev-Drama. The ruins of the Kremen fortress are situated 4 kilometers northwest of the village. The fortress is small - 600 m² and built of local stone. It is accessible only from west, where a high wall was erected, which is well preserved nowadays up to 8 meters height.
