= Sivria =

Peak in Bulgaria

Sivria (Сиврия)
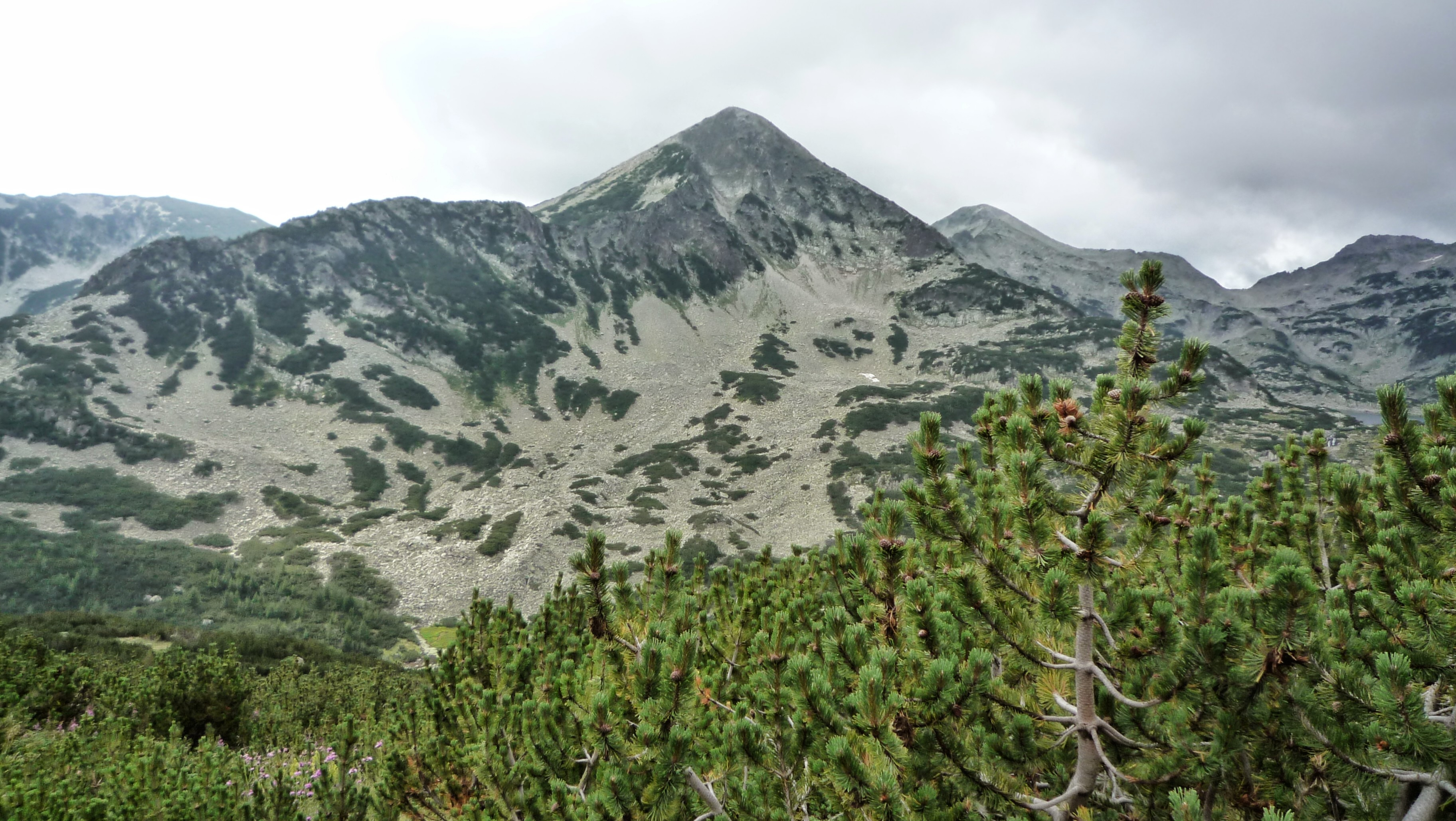

Highest point
- Elevation: 2,591 m (8,501 ft)
- Coordinates: 41°42′22.99″N 23°31′6.79″E

Geography
- Location: Blagoevgrad Province, Bulgaria
- Parent range: Pirin Mountains

Sivria (Bulgarian: Сиврия) is a 2,591 m high peak in the Pirin mountain range, south-western Bulgaria. It is located in the northern part of Pirin on the Dzhangalitsa ridge that stems from Pirin's main ridge at the summit of Dzhano (2,668 m). The eastern slopes descent to the Kremenski Lakes, while the northern and western slopes descent almost vertically to the Popovski cirque.

Seen from the Bezbog Crest, Sivria raises dramatically and appears imposing, but the view to the peak from the Popovo Lake or the summit of Dzhengal (2,730 m) is less impressive, as its very top appears to rise just a little from the crest of the Dzhangalitsa ridge. The eastern and western slopes are easily accessible but on the rocky northern face there is a climbing tour of category II "a". It is sometimes called Dzhangalski Peak after the homonymous ridge by the locals.

== Gallery ==
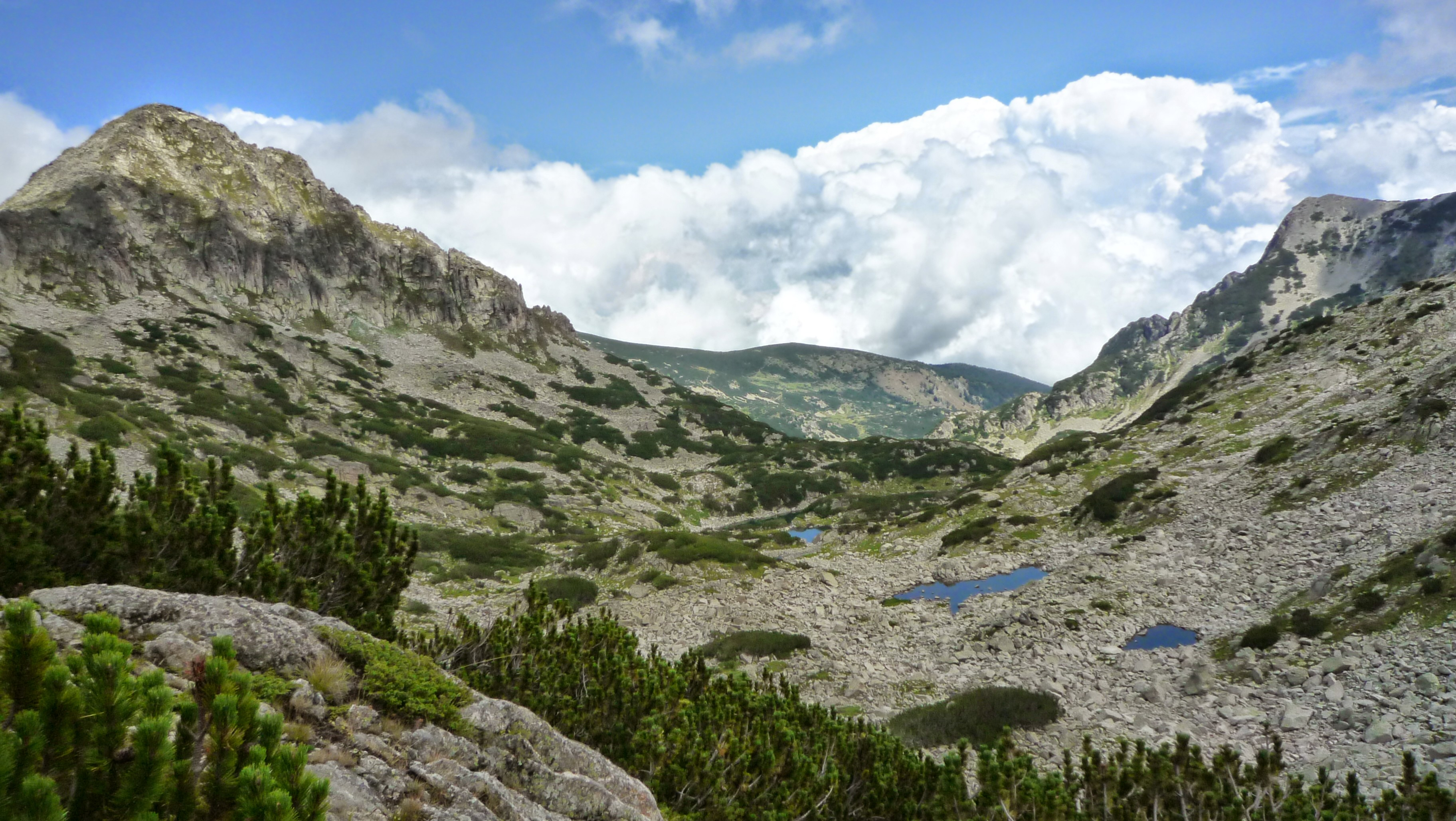

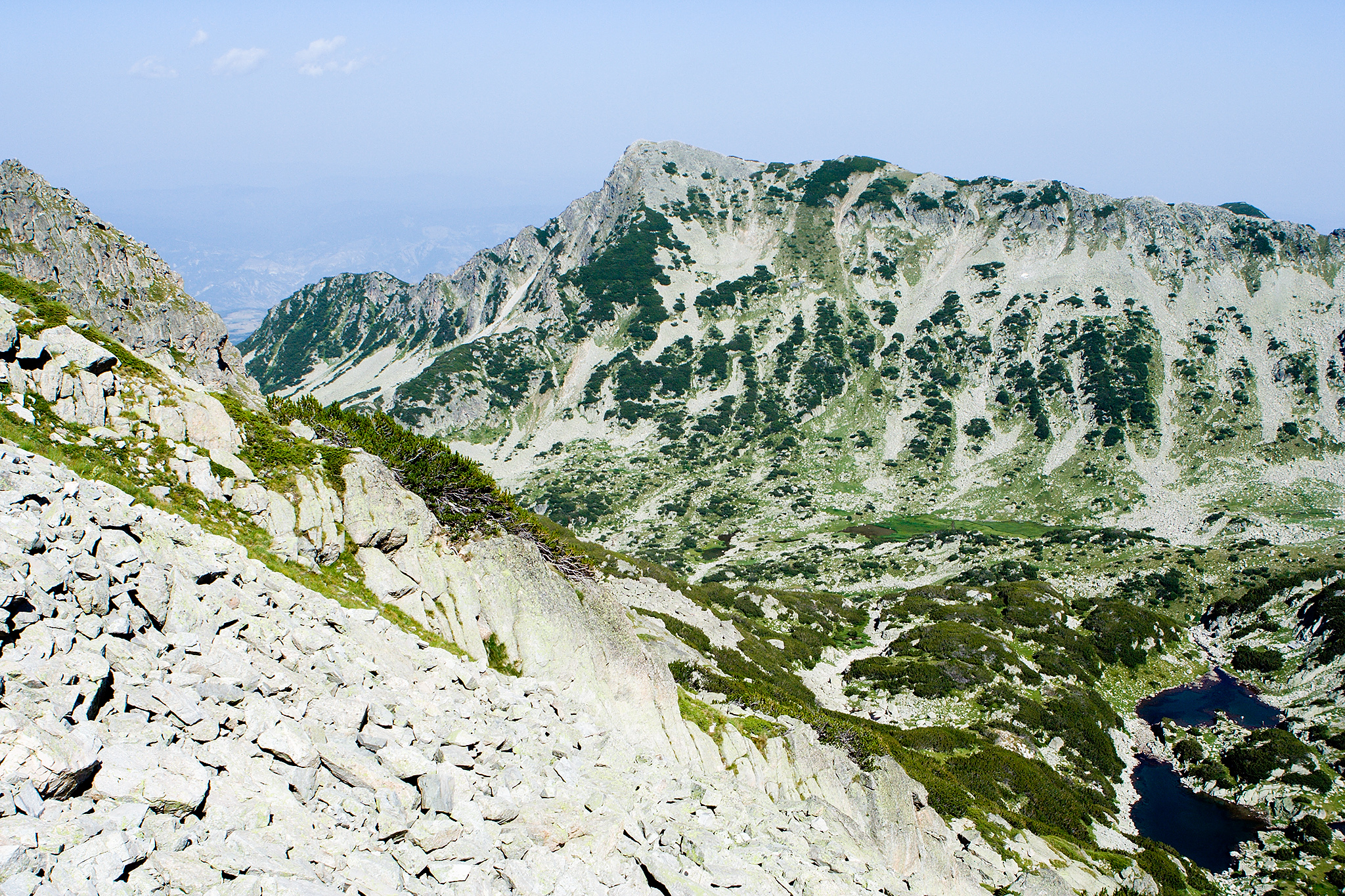

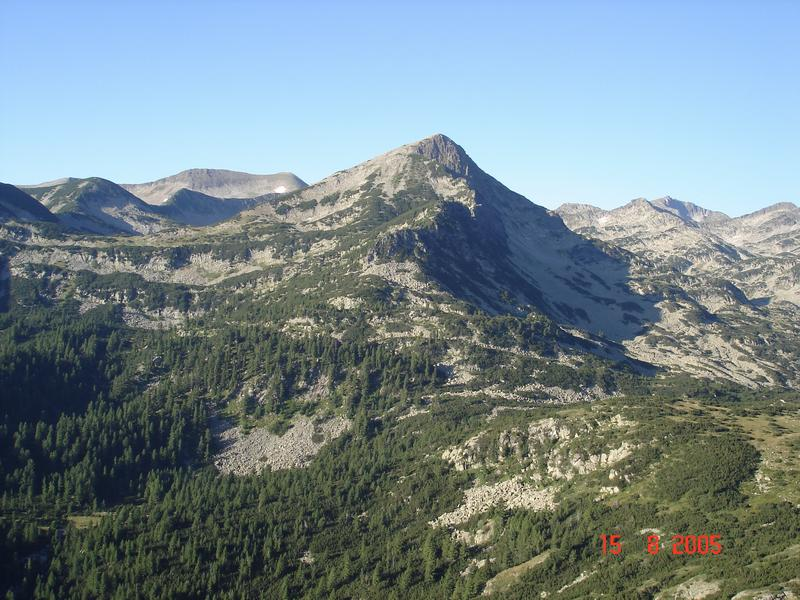
