= Dzhano =

Peak in Bulgaria

Dzhano (Джано)
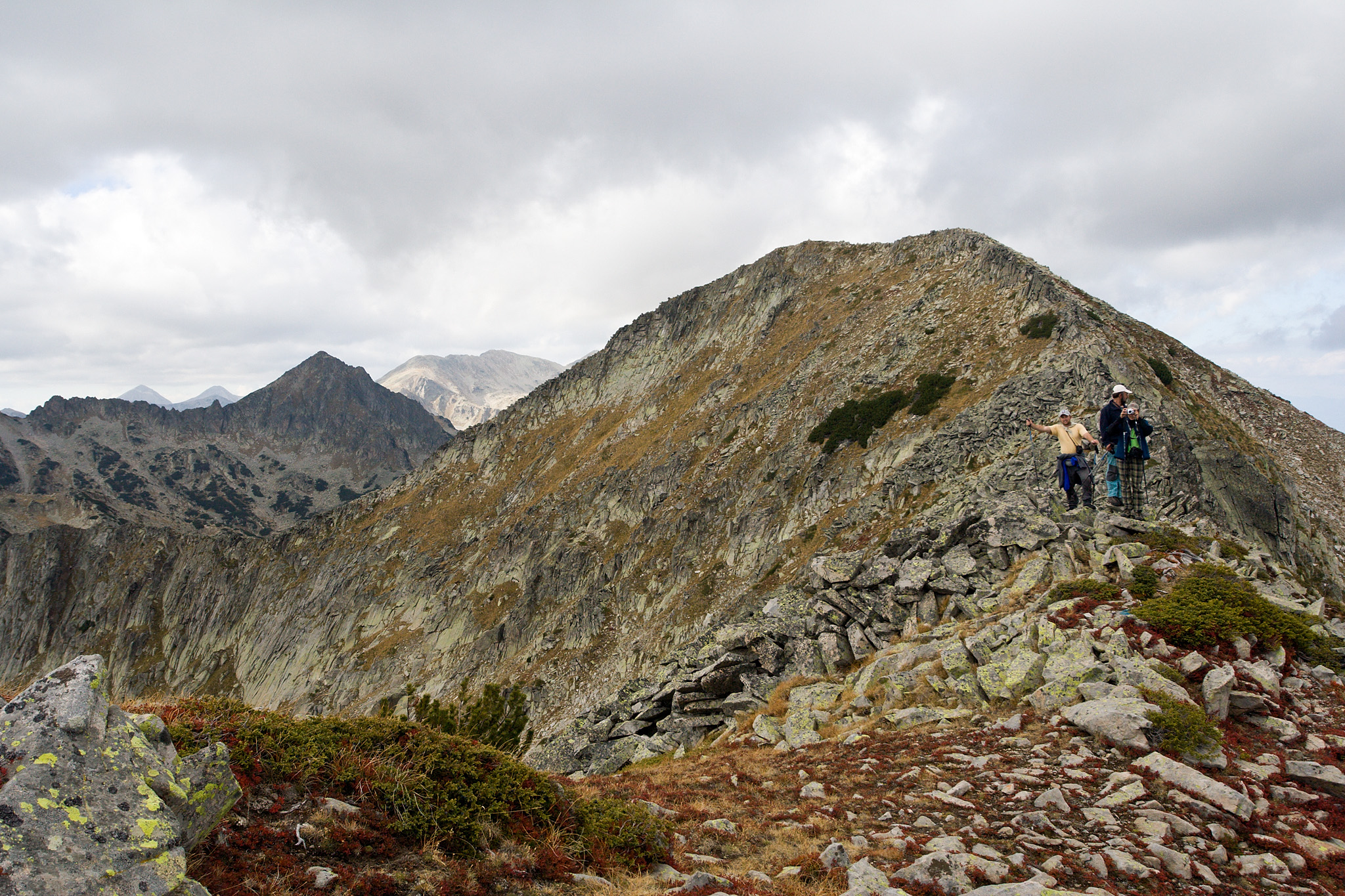

Highest point
- Elevation: 2,668 m (8,753 ft)
- Coordinates: 41°41′37.25″N 23°30′53.71″E

Geography
- Location: Blagoevgrad Province, Bulgaria
- Parent range: Pirin Mountains

Dzhano (Bulgarian: Джано [ˈd͡ʒano]) is a 2,668 m high peak in the Pirin mountain range, south-western Bulgaria. It is located in the northern part of Pirin on the mountain's main ridge between Demirkapia Saddle and the summit of Chengelchal (2,709 m) in the south. From Dzhano the main ridge turns in southern direction. To the north the short secondary ridge Dzhangalitsa leads to the summit of Sivria (2,591 m). The north-eastern slopes descent to the Kremenski cirque and the homonymous lakes, to the east is the Kamenishki cirque and to the west — the Demirkapia one.

The peak is built up of porphyry granite blocks and is covered in moraines.
