= Dobrinishte =

Dobrinishte Добринище
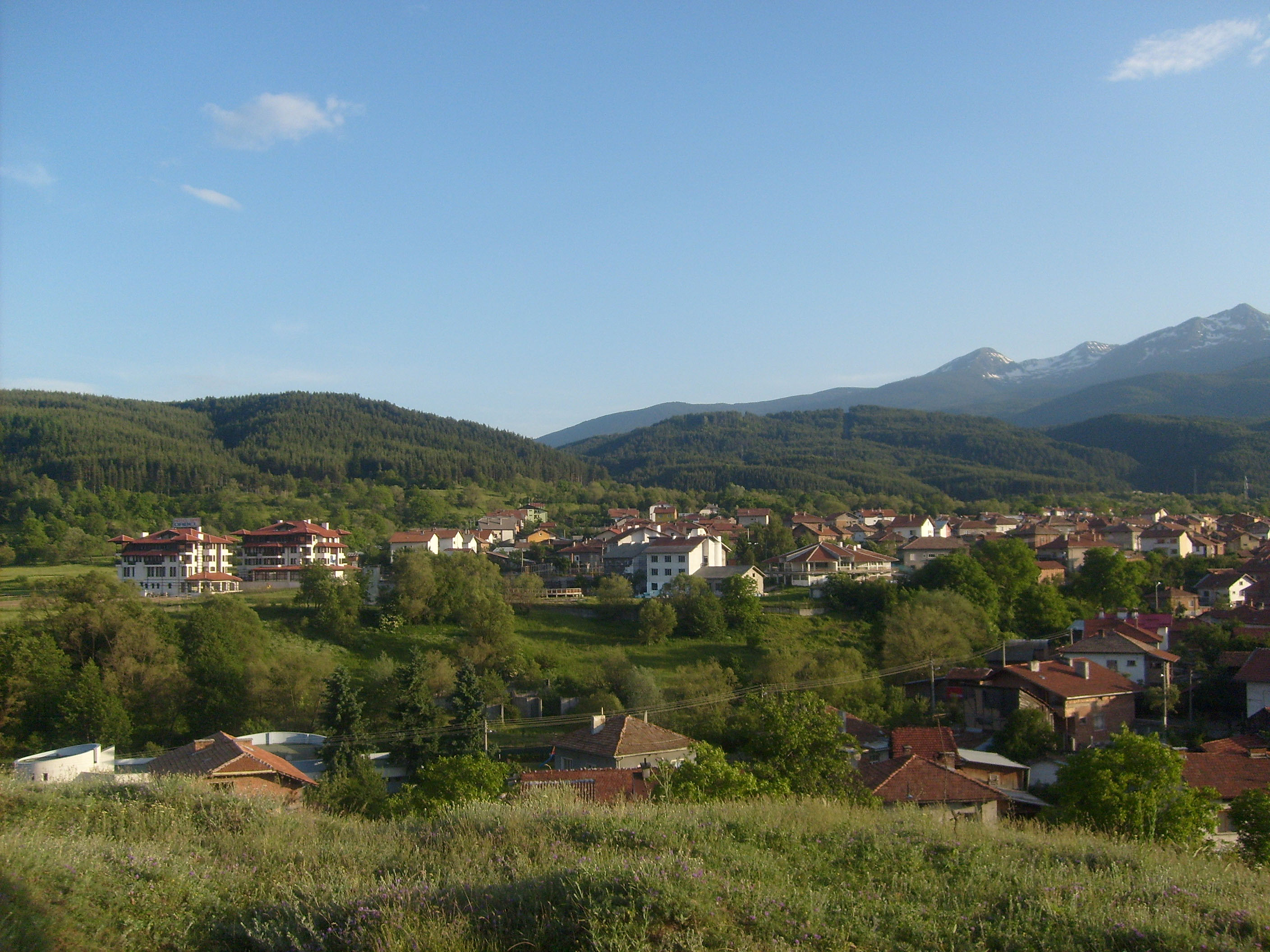
- Dobrinishte

- Location of Dobrinishte
- Coordinates: 41°49′16″N 23°33′44″E
- Country: Bulgaria
- Province (Oblast): Blagoevgrad
- Municipality (Obshtina): Bansko

Government
  - Mayor: Ivan Sakarev (PP-DB)
- Elevation: 842 m (2,762 ft)

Population (15.09.2023)
  - Total: 2,564
- Time zone: UTC+2 (EET)
  - Summer (DST): UTC+3 (EEST)
- Postal Code: 2777
- Area code: 07447

Dobrinishte (Bulgarian: Добринище [dobˈriniʃtɛ]) is a small town and ski resort in the Blagoevgrad Province, Bansko Municipality, southwestern Bulgaria. As of 2006 it had 2973 inhabitants. It is located 6 km east of Bansko, a famous winter resort. It has an altitude of 850 m and is surrounded by the Rila, Pirin, and Rhodope mountains. Dobrinishte offers good conditions for both winter and summer tourism: beautiful nature, hospitable population, ski runs, mineral waters and opportunities for rural and ecotourism. According to legends and song, between 6th and 15th century Dobrinishte was a Bulgarian stronghold which halted the Byzantines from invading the country from the valley of the Mesta River.

Dobrinishte is also a terminal station of the scenic Septemvri-Dobrinishte narrow gauge line from Septemvri (on the Sofia-Plovdiv line).

The village is a famous spa resort with 17 mineral springs with temperatures of 30-43 °C. The water is used to cure different diseases.
