= Ivan Apostolov =

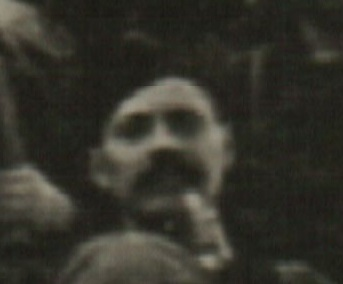
- Born: 1847; Kumanich, Ottoman Empire
- Died: 1926 (aged 78–79); Dolna Banya, Bulgaria
- Organization: IMARO

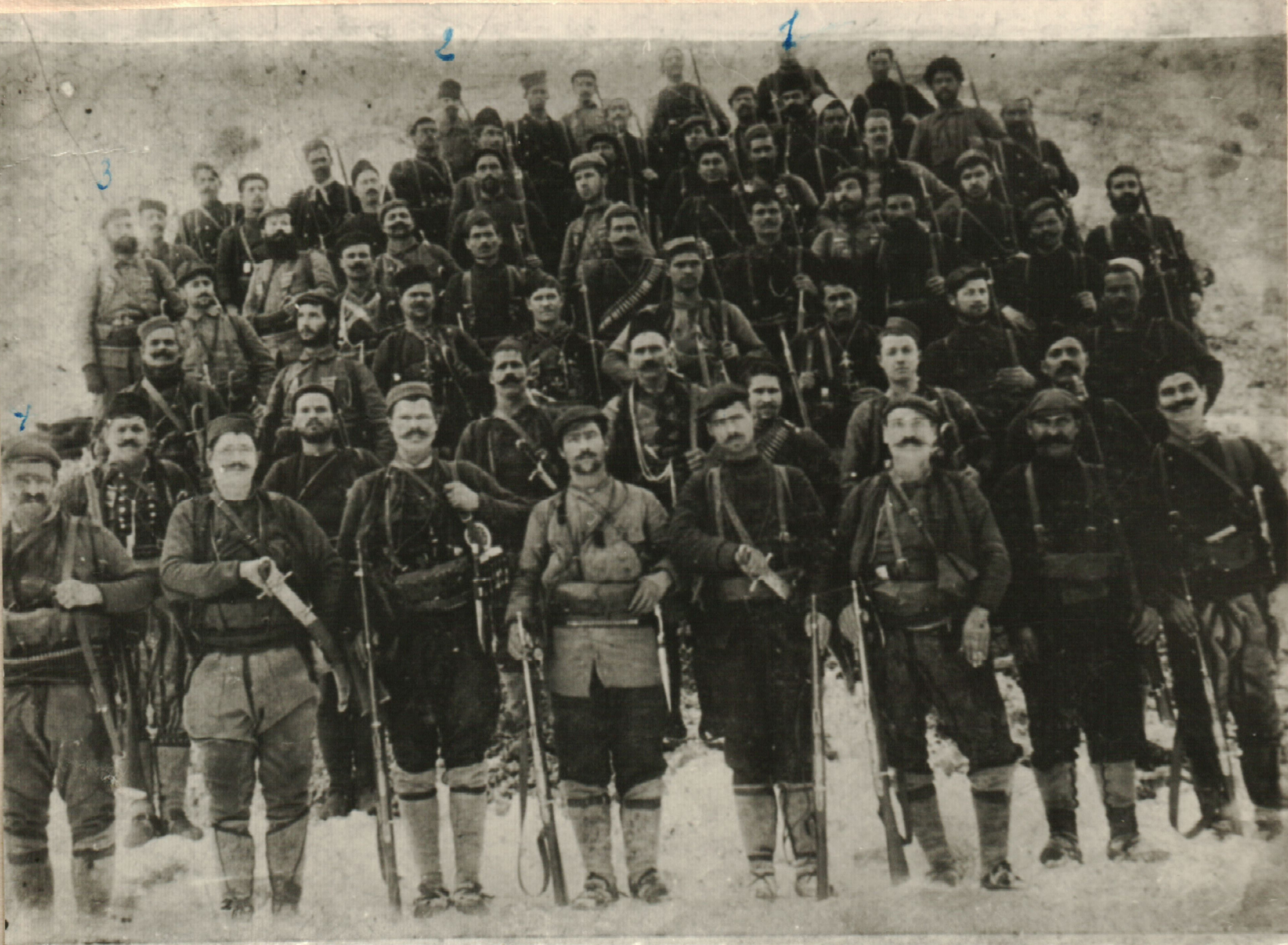
IMARO group photo in which Ivan Apostolov appears

Ivan Apostolov (Bulgarian: Иван Апостолов), known as Ivan Daskala (the Teacher), was a Bulgarian haydut and revolutionary, a member of the Internal Macedonian-Adrianople Revolutionary Organization (IMARO).

Apostolov was born in the village of Kumanich, today located in the region of Kato Nevrokopi, Drama regional unit, Greece, and known as Dasoto. For many years, he was a haydut leader in his own region. From 1877 to 1878, he participated in the Russo-Turkish War. In 1879, he was a member of the revolutionary band of Orcho voyvoda and participated in the Kresna-Razlog Uprising. During a battle, he was captured and exiled to Rhodes Island. In 1897, he was released as a result of an amnesty, after which he worked as a teacher in his village.

In 1902, after Apostolov entered the revolutionary organization IMARO, he became a leader of a revolutionary band in the region of Nevrokop. In the beginning of February 1903, he participated at the meeting between Gotse Delchev and the workers of the Serres revolutionary region. During the Ilinden-Preobrazhenie Uprising, he participated with his revolutionary band in the attack on the Turkish garrison in the village of Obidim, together with Yane Sandanski, Mihail Chakov, Stoyan Malchankov and Nikola Gruychin. On 16 September 1903 he participated in the successful battle in Arami Bunar (Haydushki Kladenets).
