= Chengelchal =

Peak in Bulgaria

Chengelchal (Ченгелчал)
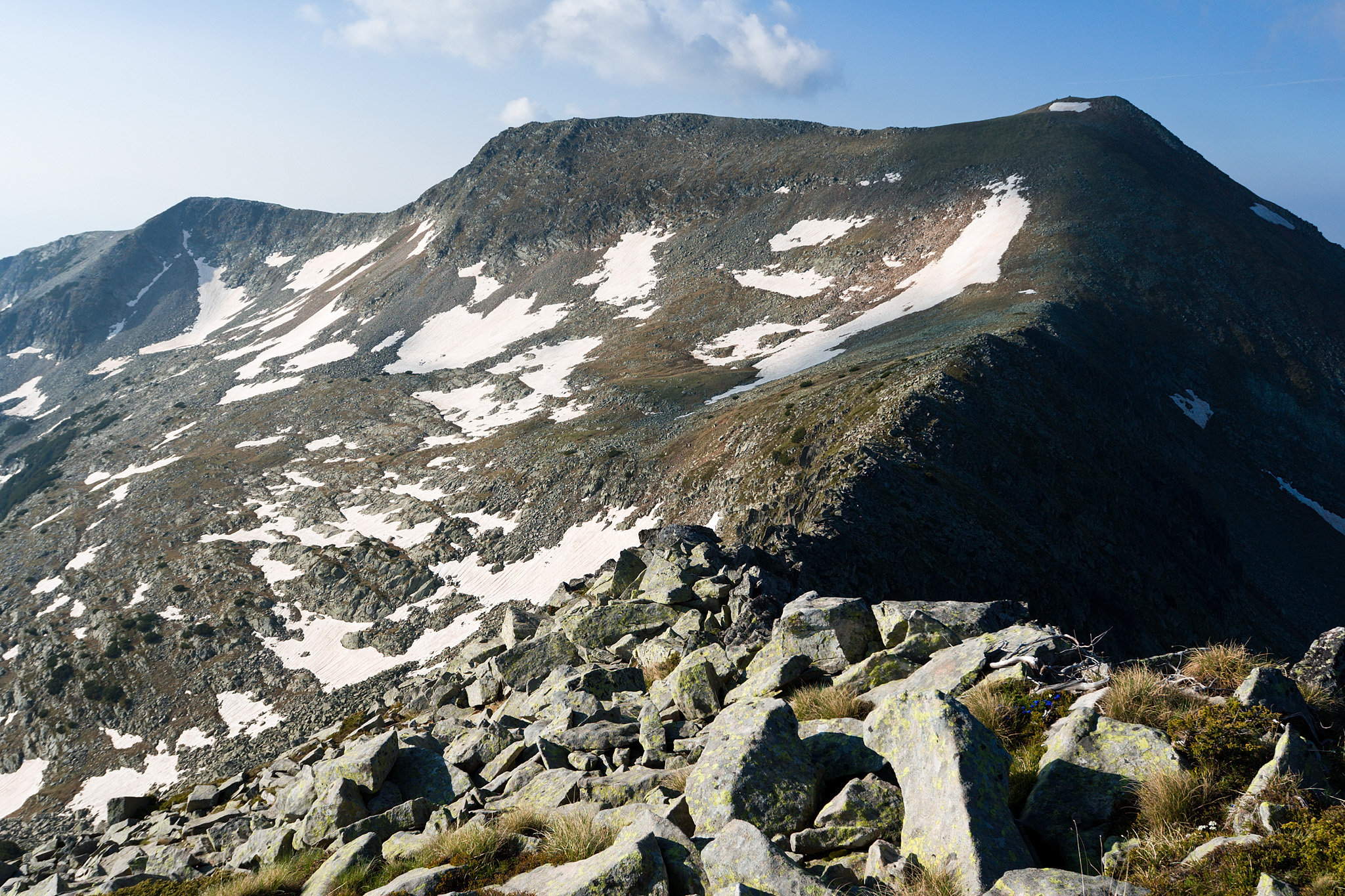

Highest point
- Elevation: 2,709 m (8,888 ft)
- Coordinates: 41°41′37.25″N 23°30′53.71″E

Geography
- Location: Blagoevgrad Province, Bulgaria
- Parent range: Pirin Mountains

Chengelchal (Bulgarian: Ченгелчал) is a 2,709 m high peak in the Pirin mountain range, south-western Bulgaria. It is located in the northern part of Pirin on the mountain's main ridge to the south of the summit of Dzhano (2,668 m), with which it is linked via a narrow and rocky saddle known as Malkoto Konche.
