= Mesta, Bulgaria =

Mesta Места
- Village
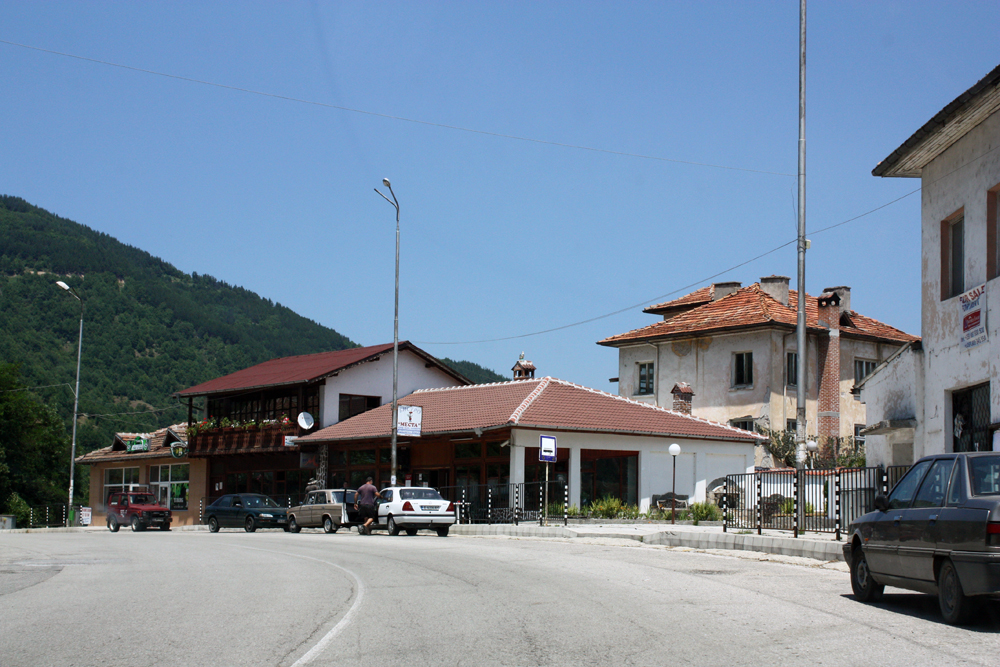

- Location within Bulgaria
- Coordinates: 41°45′N 23°41′E
- Country: Bulgaria
- Province: Blagoevgrad Province
- Municipality: Bansko

Government
  - Mayor: Georgi Toskov (NDSV)
- Elevation: 920 m (3,020 ft)

Population (15-12-2010)
  - Total: 248
- GRAO
- Time zone: UTC+2 (EET)
  - Summer (DST): UTC+3 (EEST)
- Postal Code: 2772
- Area code: 074409

Mesta (Bulgarian: Места) is a village in southwestern Bulgaria, located in the Bansko Municipality of the Blagoevgrad Province. The village is situated alongside of the secondary road 19 from Razlog to Drama on the right bank of Mesta River. The first houses were erected there after 1914 year. It was part of the village Obidim with the old name Obidimski hanove until 1965 year, when it was separated as different village and named Mesta. There are a kindergarten, a primary school "Stt Cyril and Methodius" and a community center "Ivan Kyulev" with a public library. Small restaurants and guest-houses for the tourists have been opened in the recent years.
