= Filipovo, Blagoevgrad Province =

Filipovo Филипово
- Village
- Location of Filipovo
- Coordinates: 41°46′1″N 23°40′59″E
- Country: Bulgaria
- Province (Oblast): Blagoevgrad
- Municipality (Obshtina): Bansko

Government
  - Mayor: Faim Molla (DPS)
- Elevation: 863 m (2,831 ft)

Population (15.09.2023)
  - Total: 603
- Time zone: UTC+2 (EET)
  - Summer (DST): UTC+3 (EEST)
- Postal Code: 2775
- Area code: 074496

Filipovo (Bulgarian: Филипово) is a village (село) in southwestern Bulgaria, located in the Bansko Municipality (Община Банско) of the Blagoevgrad Province (област Благоевград) 1 km east of the road Bansko - Gotse Delchev on the Eastern bank of the Mesta River.

== Population ==
The village of Filipovo had 602 inhabitants at the end of 2019.
