= Dolno Osenovo =

- Village
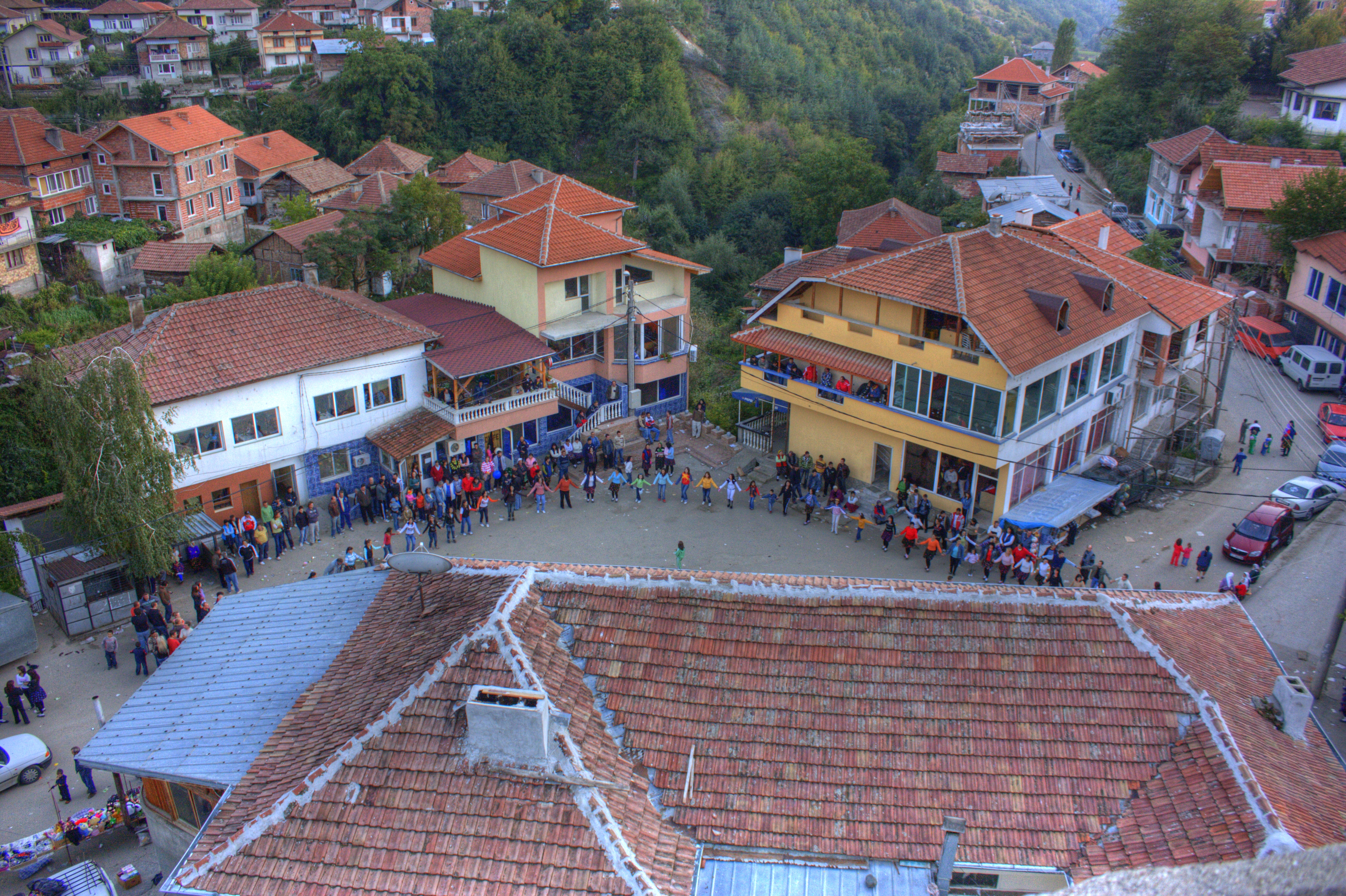
- Pomaks dancing during the Eid al-Fitr (Ramazan Bayramı) at Dolno Osenov village. View from the top of the minaret of the local mosque

- Location within Bulgaria
- Coordinates: 41°57′N 23°15′E
- Country: Bulgaria
- Province: Blagoevgrad Province
- Municipality: Simitli Municipality
- Time zone: UTC+2 (EET)
  - Summer (DST): UTC+3 (EEST)

Dolno Osenovo is a village in Simitli Municipality, in Blagoevgrad Province, in southwestern Bulgaria.
