= Bansko Municipality =

Bansko Municipality Община Банско
- Municipality (Obshtina)
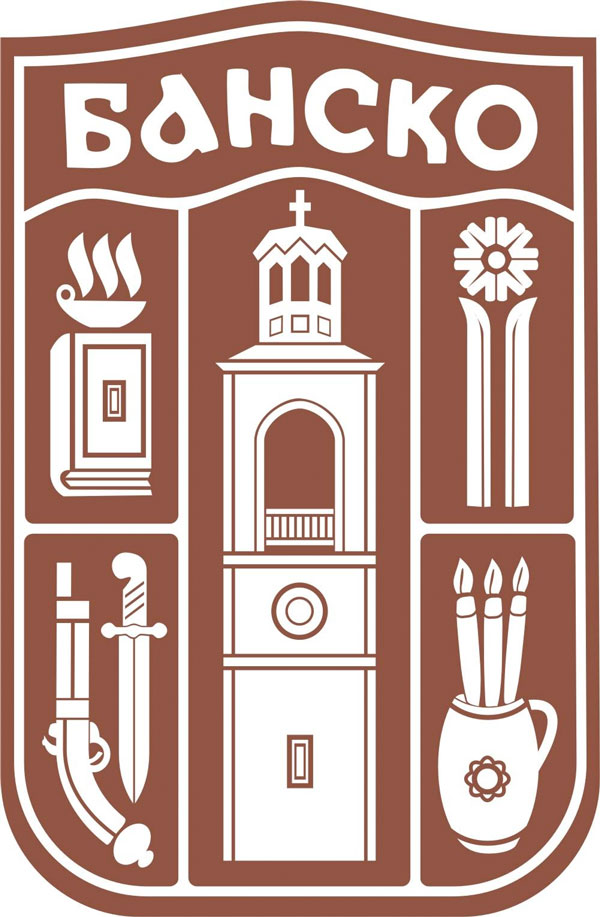
- Coat of arms

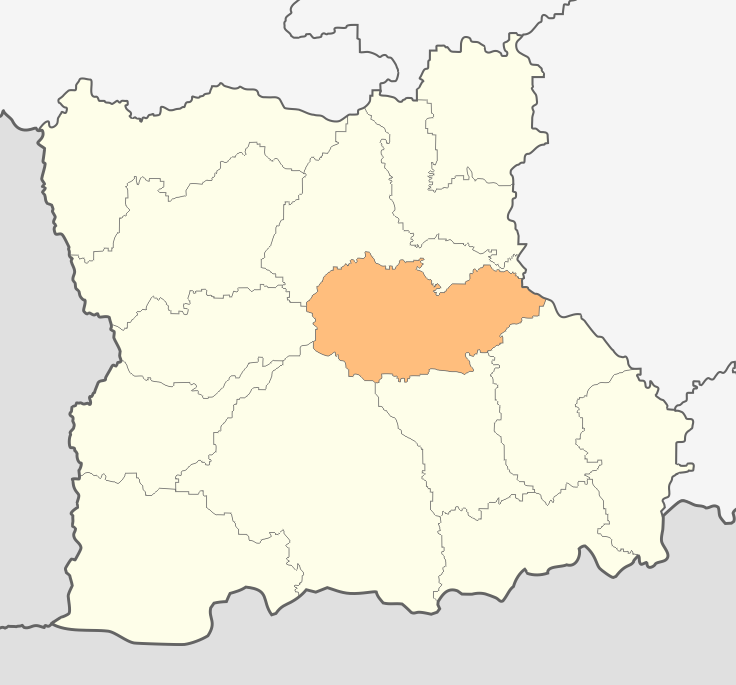
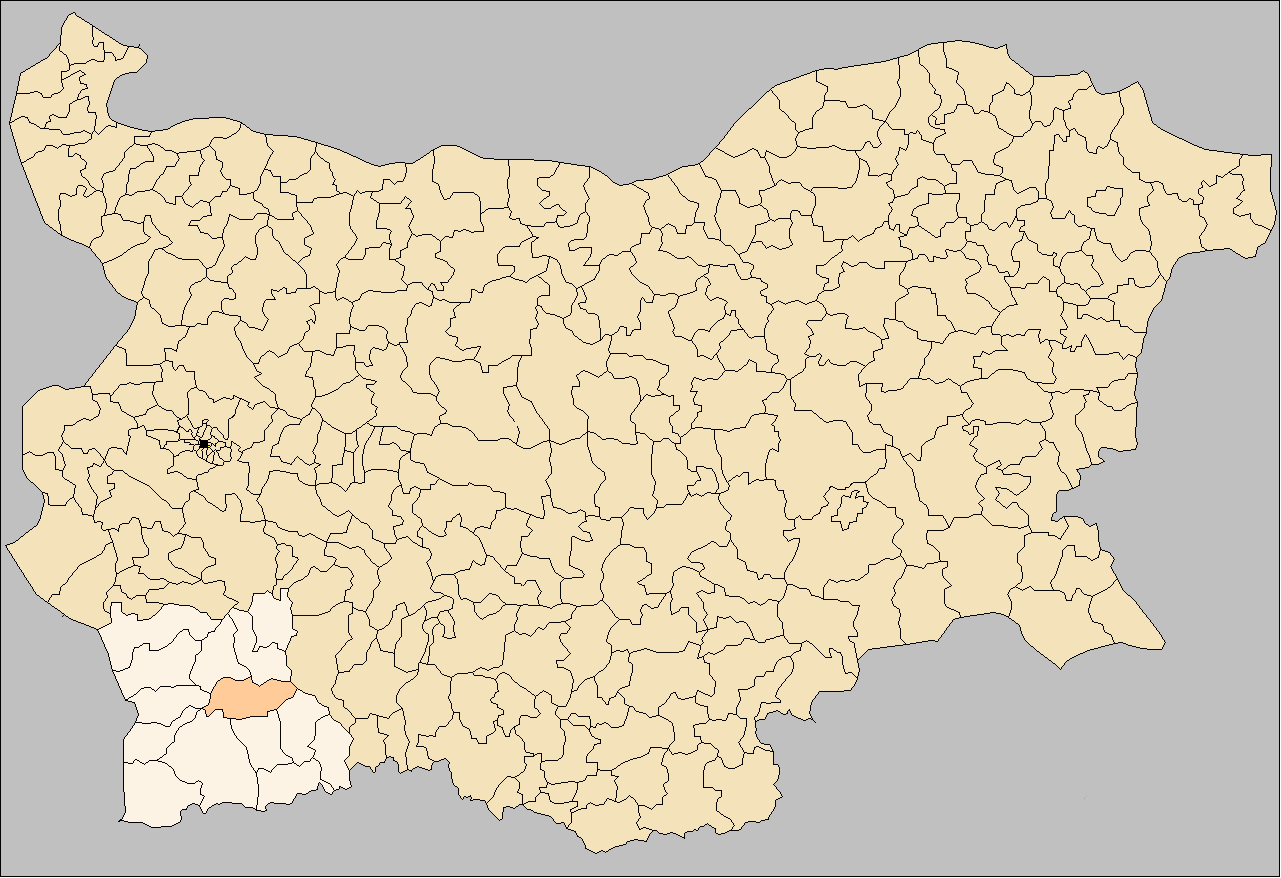
- Location in Blagoevgrad province Location on map of Bulgaria
- Coordinates: 41°50′N 23°29′E
- Country: Bulgaria
- Province (Oblast): Blagoevgrad
- Seat: Bansko

Area
  - Total: 475.88 km^{2} (183.74 sq mi)
- Elevation: 871 m (2,858 ft)

Population (2011 census)
  - Total: 13,088
  - Density: 27.503/km^{2} (71.232/sq mi)
- Time zone: UTC+2 (EET)
  - Summer (DST): UTC+3 (EEST)
- Postal code: 2770
- Area code: 07443
- Website: www.bansko.bg/en

Bansko Municipality (Bulgarian: Община Банско, romanized: Obshtina Bansko) is situated in southwestern Bulgaria and is one of the municipalities of Blagoevgrad Province.

== Settlements ==
Town/Village	Area (km^{2})	Population
Bansko (Банско)	148.280	8,911
Dobrinishte (Добринище)	80.356	2,843
Filipovo (Филипово)	15.157	597
Gostun (Гостун)	52.425	75
Kremen (Кремен)	61.869	299
Mesta (Места)	16.259	274
Obidim (Обидим)	64.962	142
Osenovo (Осеново)	52.832	114
Total	492.14	13,255

== Demographics ==
=== Religion ===
According to the latest Bulgarian census of 2011, the religious composition, among those who answered the optional question on religious identification, was the following:

Religious composition of Bansko Municipality
Orthodox Christianity	89.97%
Islam	4.47%
Protestantism	1.83%
Catholicism	0.18%
No religion	1.00%
Prefer not to answer and indefinable	2.55%
