= Obidim =

Obidim Обидим
- Village
- Location within Bulgaria
- Coordinates: 41°47′N 23°39′E
- Country: Bulgaria
- Province: Blagoevgrad Province
- Municipality: Bansko

Government
  - Suffragan Mayor: Mariyana Parlapanova

Area
  - Total: 64,962 km^{2} (25,082 sq mi)
- Elevation: 1,200 m (3,900 ft)

Population (15-12-2010)
  - Total: 120
- GRAO
- Time zone: UTC+2 (EET)
  - Summer (DST): UTC+3 (EEST)
- Postal Code: 2776
- Area code: 074408
- Website: http://obidim.net/index.php

Obidim (Bulgarian: Обидим) is a village (село) in southwestern Bulgaria, located in the Bansko Municipality of the Blagoevgrad Province in Pirin mountain 15 kilometers southeast of Bansko and 52 km southeast of Blagoevgrad.

As of 2006 it has 141 inhabitants. The village was founded in the 14th century. During the Ottoman rule, the local population strongly preserved the Bulgarian patriotic spirit and as a result the village was burned down in 1903 and 1912 when it was finally liberated. In the land of the village has a total of 13 churches, chapels, iconostasis and a monastery. Church of Saint Nicholas Chudotvorets was built in 1842 and consecrated in 1843.

Obidim Peak on Trinity Peninsula in Antarctica is named after the village.
