= Nestos (river) =

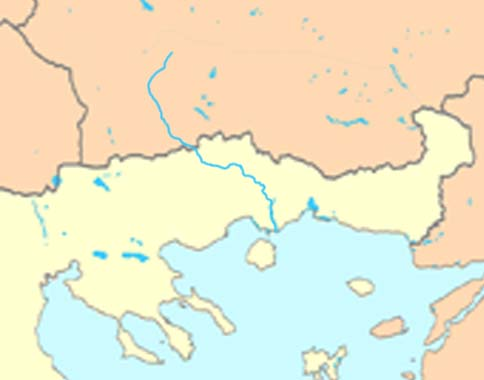
- Native name: Νέστος (Greek) Ме́ста (Bulgarian)

Location
- Countries: Bulgaria and Greece

Physical characteristics
- Source
  - location: Rila Mountains, Bulgaria
  - coordinates: 42°07′10″N 23°35′10″E
  - elevation: 2,240 m (7,350 ft)
- Mouth
  - location: Aegean Sea opposite Thasos, Greece
  - coordinates: 40°50′51″N 24°48′15″E
- Length: 230 km (140 mi)
- Basin size: 5,184 km^{2} (2,002 sq mi)
- Discharge
  - location: Hadzhidimovo, Bulgaria
  - average: 29.85 m^{3}/s (1,054 cu ft/s)

The Nestos (Greek: Νέστος [ˈnestos]) or the Mesta (Bulgarian: Ме́ста [ˈmɛstɐ]), formerly the Mesta Karasu (Ottoman Turkish: مستا قرە سو), is a river in Bulgaria and Greece. It rises in the Rila Mountains and flows into the Aegean Sea near the island of Thasos. It plunges down towering canyons toward the Aegean Sea through mostly metamorphic formations. At the end, the main stream spreads over the coastal plain of Chrysoupolis and expands as a deltaic system with freshwater lakes and ponds forming the Nestos delta. The length of the river is 230 km (140 mi), of which 126 km (78 mi) flow through Bulgaria and the rest in Greece. Its drainage area is 5,184 km^{2} (2,002 sq mi), of which 66% is in Bulgaria. It forms some gorges in Rila and Pirin. The longest gorge between Pirin to the west and the Rhodope Mountains to the east is the 25-km long Momina Klisura in Bulgaria.

The Mesta's longest tributary is the Dospat (or Despatis). The banks of the river are covered mainly by deciduous trees that extend into halfway between Bulgaria and Greece where it forms the modern boundary of Greek Macedonia and Thrace, as well as the boundary between the Kavala and the Xanthi regional units, having first crossed the Drama regional unit. The river later forms a delta to the north where swamplands, wetlands and a lagoon once existed except in the east.

== History ==
In the Geography of Claudius Ptolemy, the river is referred to as Nestus (Νέστος), and is said to form the boundary between ancient Macedonia and Thrace.

Because of its flow between canyons and inaccessible mountain areas, Nestos was not navigable in antiquity and also did not offer a natural terrestrial road along the riverbed. Concerning the horizontal communication from the East to the West, the river had only two passes, one in the middle and the other in the lower watercourse, which were controlled respectively by the cities of Nicopolis and Topeiros. The first pass, near Nicopolis, allowed the communication between the valleys of the rivers Strymon and Hebros (Evros), while through the second pass, near Topeiros, passed an ancient road (and later the Roman road of Via Egnatia) that served the communication between the East and the West. In Nestos' valley (east bank) north of the south pass, the Dii used to live, while Satrae were living to the south. Finally, Nestos played an important role in the urban and economic history of the inhabitants of the estuary, where the city of Abdera and later Topeiros, founded by the Emperor Trajan. This is presumed by the deification of the river and its depiction on coins of the imperial period.

== Honour ==
Mesta Peak on Livingston Island in the South Shetland Islands, Antarctica is named after Mesta River.

== Gallery ==
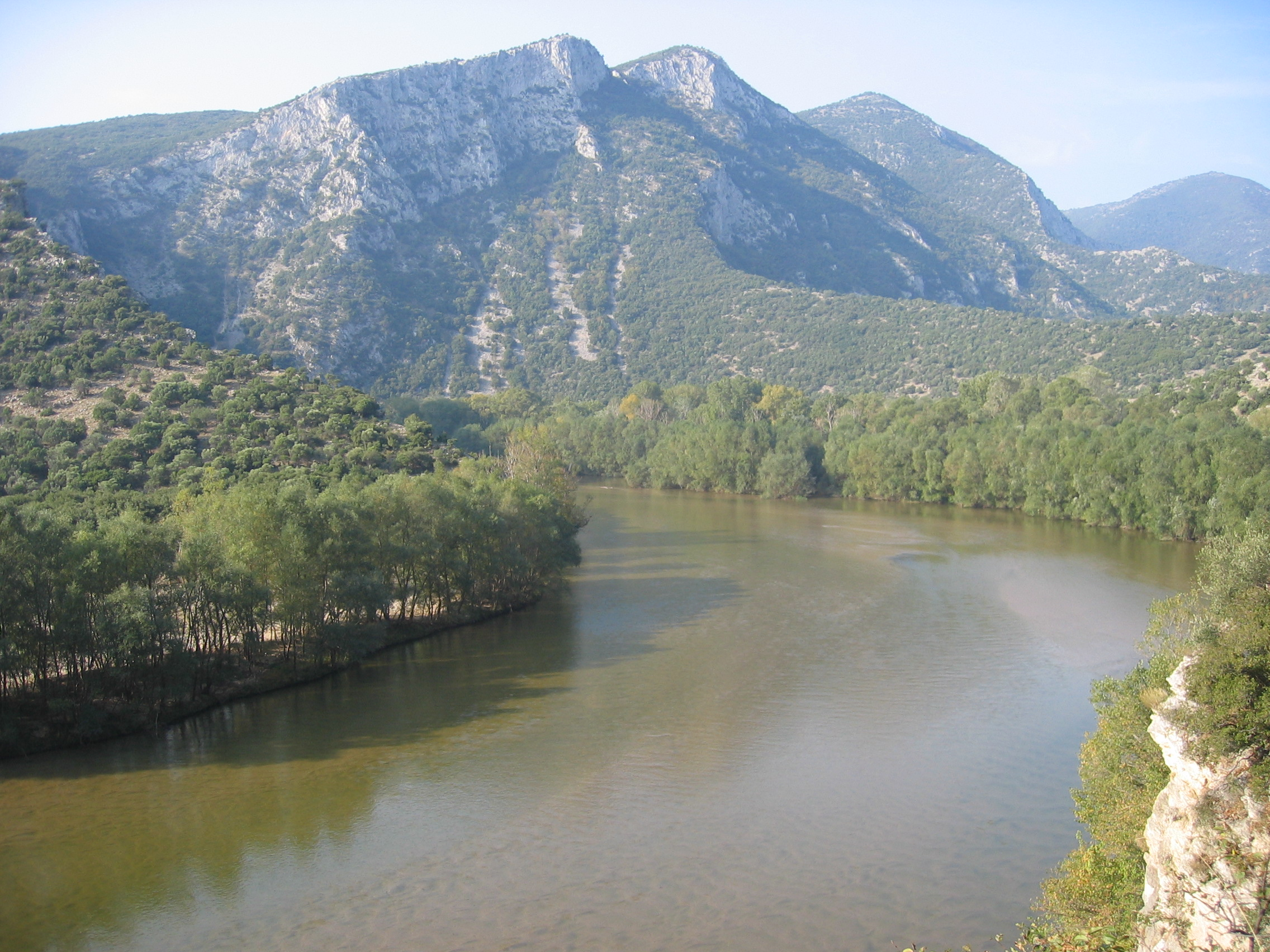
Nestos in Greece

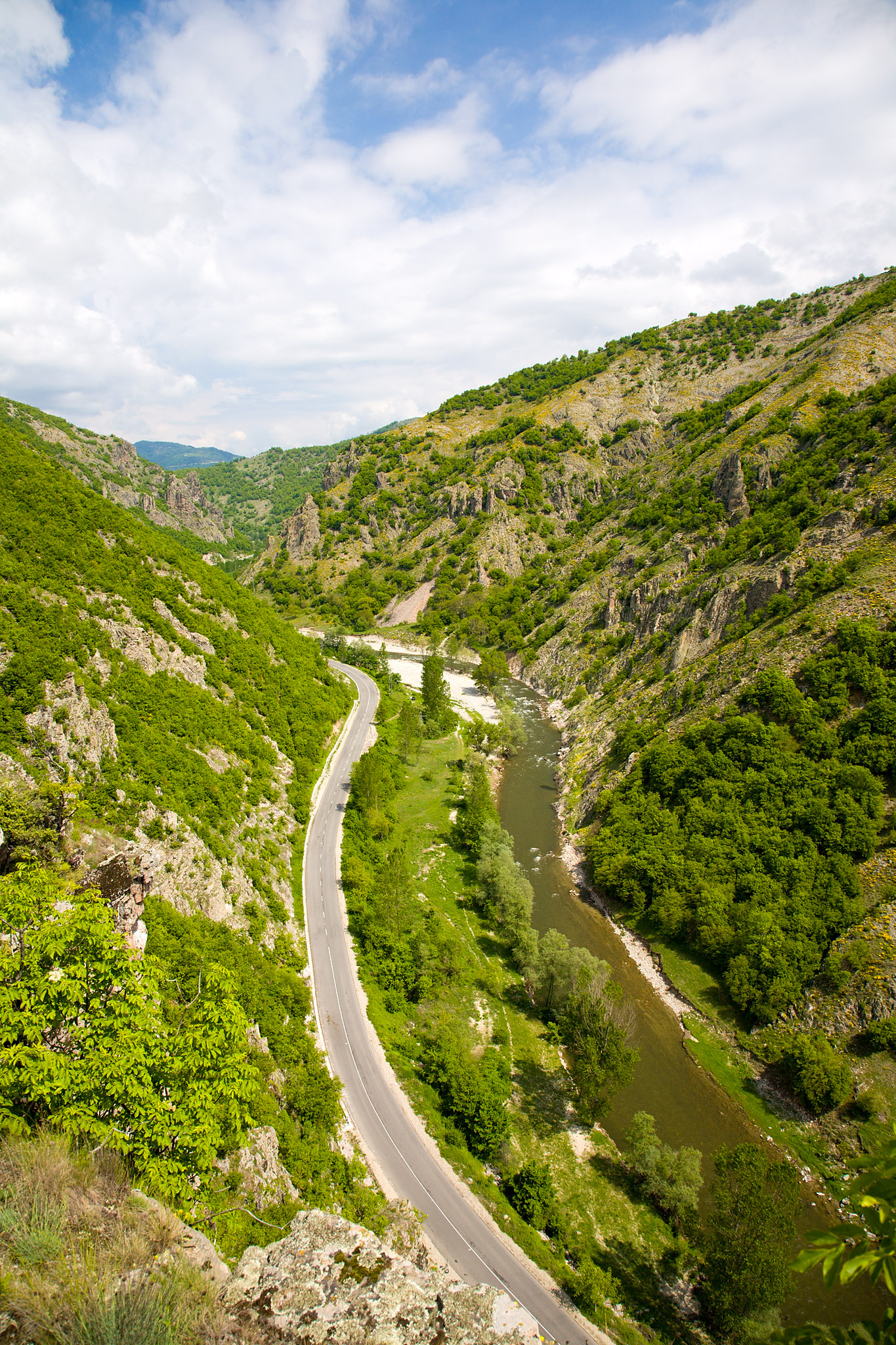
The Momina Klisura gorge along the Mesta in Bulgaria
