= Rila (disambiguation) =

Rila may refer to:

== Bulgaria ==
- Rila, the highest mountain range of Bulgaria and the Balkans
- Seven Rila Lakes, group of glacial lakes in Rila
- Rila River, river in Bulgaria
- Rila Municipality, municipality
- Rila (town), a town in Rila Municipality, Kyustendil Province, Bulgaria
- Rila Monastery, the largest Eastern Orthodox monastery in Bulgaria
- Rila fragments, Glagolithic manuscript
- Rila National Park, largest national park in Bulgaria
- Central Rila Reserve, nature reserve within Rila National Park
- Rila Monastery Nature Park, nature park
- Rila Monastery Forest, nature reserve in Rila Monastery Nature Park

== Other ==
- Rila Point, ice-free area in Antarctica
- Rila, Tibet, a village in the Tibet Autonomous Region of China
- Répertoire international de la littérature de l'art, an index of art periodicals
- Rila Fukushima, Japanese model and actress
- Rila Mukherjee, Indian historian and author

== See also ==
- Rhode Island Light Artillery in the American Civil War
