= Pastra, Bulgaria =

Pastra Пастра
- Village
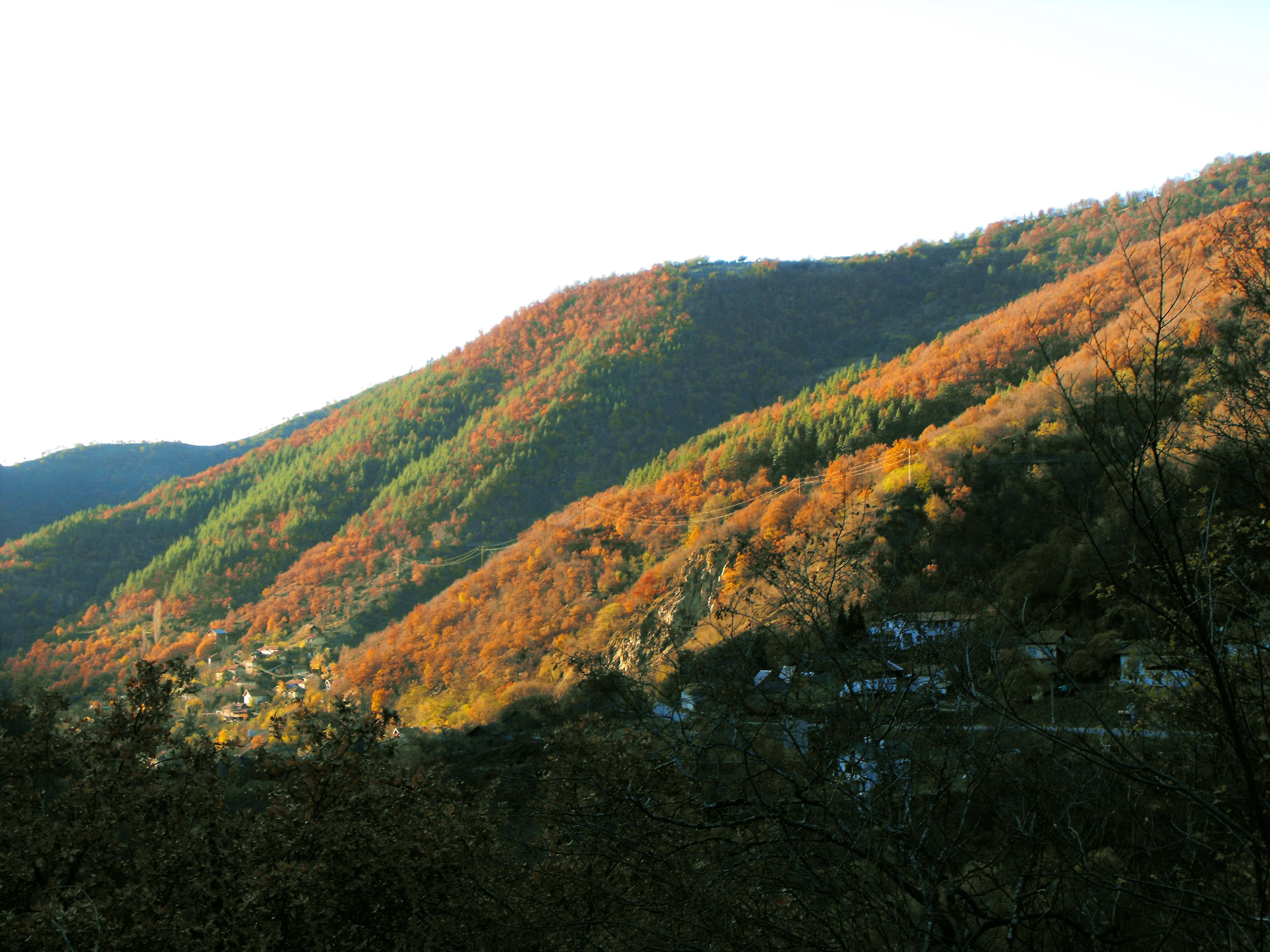

- Location within Bulgaria
- Coordinates: 42°7′N 23°13′E
- Country: Bulgaria
- Province: Kyustendil Province
- Municipality: Rila

Area
  - Total: 33.948 km^{2} (13.107 sq mi)
- Elevation: 803 m (2,635 ft)

Population (2013)
  - Total: 151
- Time zone: UTC+2 (EET)
  - Summer (DST): UTC+3 (EEST)
- Postal code: 2631

Pastra (Bulgarian: Пастра) is a small mountain village in the Rila Municipality of Kyustendil Province in south-western Bulgaria. As of 2013, it had 151 inhabitants. It lies at the western foothills of the Rila Mountains on the banks of the Rilska River just outside the borders of the Rila Monastery Nature Park. It is situated at 8 km east of the municipal centre Rila, 12 km west of the Rila Monastery and some 63 km south of the national capital Sofia.

In the Middle Ages the village was part of the Bulgarian Empire. Pastra was first mentioned in written records in the 14th century Rila Charter of Emperor Ivan Shishman (r. 1371–1395), where it was listed as a possession of the Rila Monastery.

It gives its name to the Pastra Glacier in the central part of Trinity Island in the Palmer Archipelago, Antarctica.
