= Rila Monastery Forest =

Nature reserve in Bulgaria

- IUCN category Ia (strict nature reserve)
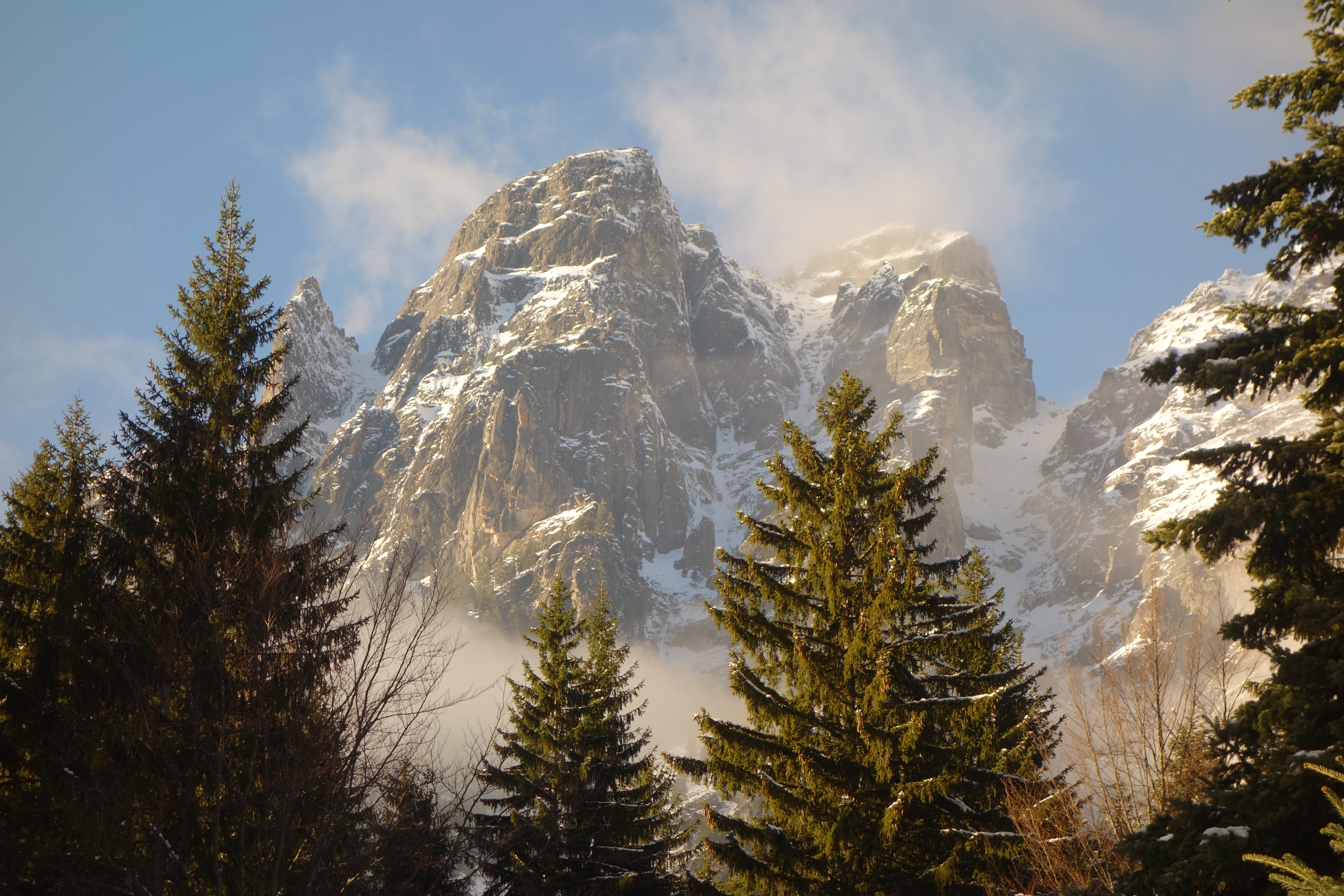

- Location within Bulgaria
- Location: Rila Municipality, Kyustendil Province, Bulgaria
- Nearest city: Rila
- Coordinates: 42°8′0″N 23°20′25″E
- Area: 36.71 km^{2} (14.17 sq mi)
- Established: 1986
- Governing body: Ministry of Environment and Water

Rila Monastery Forest (Bulgarian: Риломанастирска гора, Rilomanastirska gora) is a nature reserve in Rila Monastery Nature Park, located in the Rila mountain range in southwestern Bulgaria. Spanning a territory of 3671 ha or 36.71 km^{2}, it was declared in April 1986 to protect primary ecosystems of coniferous and mixed coniferous–deciduous forests. It is a strict nature reserve (1st category protected territory according to Bulgarian legislation and IUCN classification).

== Geography ==
The reserve is situated in western part of Rila and is bisected in two unconnected parts by the valley of the Rilska River. It overlooks the Rila Monastery, one of the most important spiritual centers of Bulgaria. It includes forests and alpine peaks on both sides of the valley between the summits of Malyovitsa (2,729 m) and Brichebor. One of the most visited parts is the meadow of Kirilova Polyana, overlooked by forests and the raising summits of Kupenite (2,731 m), Lovnitsa (2,695 m), Zlia Zab (2,678 m), Dvuglav (2,605 m), Orlovets (2,686 m) and Eleni Vrah (2,654 m). The northern slopes of the Rilska River valley are cut by gullies, the most famous being the dizzying White and the Blue Gully that descend from the Zlia Zab massif to the valley some 1,200 m below. Administratively, it is part of Rila Municipality, Kyustendil Province.

== Flora and fauna ==
The reserve is a model of mixed deciduous–coniferous forests dominated by European silver fir (Abies alba) and European beech (Fagus sylvatica). The high-mountain population of the highly localised endemic Rila oak (Quercus protoroburoides) is unique for the country, and in places it forms the upper forest boundary. Other common trees in the local mixed forests include Norway spruce (Picea abies), Macedonian pine (Pinus peuce), Austrian pine (Pinus nigra), dwarf mountain pine (Pinus mugo), silver birch (Betula pendula) and goat willow (Salix caprea).

There are a number of rare and endemic plant species under protection, such as Anthemis orbelica, Cota tinctoria, Geum bulgaricum, Gentiana punctata, Viola orbelica, Rheum rhaponticum, Sempervivum ciliosum, Saxifraga retusa, Aubrieta gracilis, etc.

The fauna is diverse for the reserve’s limited territory, with a number of rare mammal and bird species of conservation importance, including brown bear, gray wolf, red fox, chamois, red deer, roe deer, wild boar, common buzzard, boreal owl, western capercaillie, hazel grouse, black woodpecker, northern nutcracker, European robin, Eurasian crag martin, etc. Reptiles and amphibians are represented by Aesculapian snake, viviparous lizard, common slow worm, fire salamander, European tree frog, common frog, etc. The river trout is found in the streams.

== Gallery ==
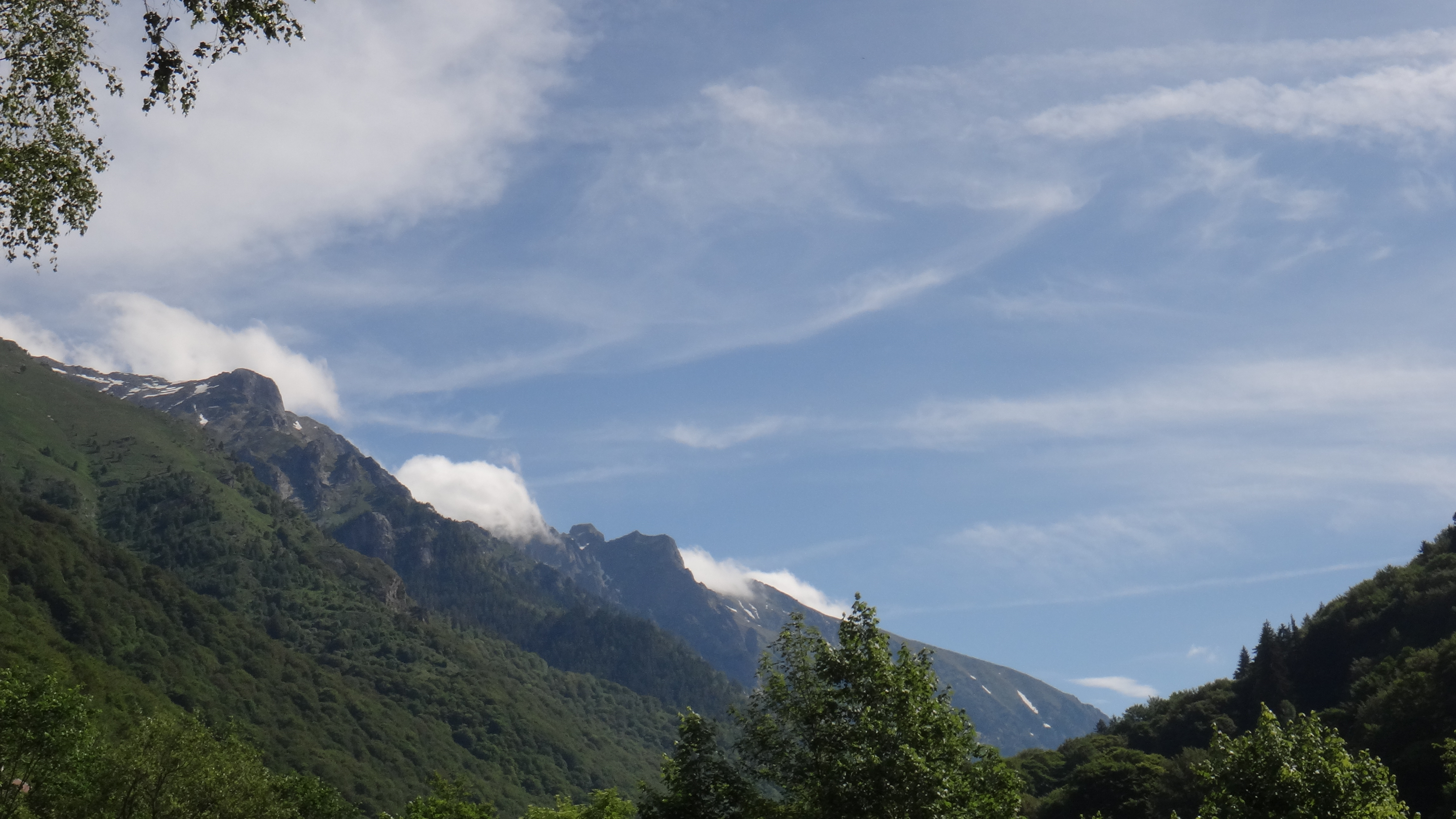
A view of the reserve

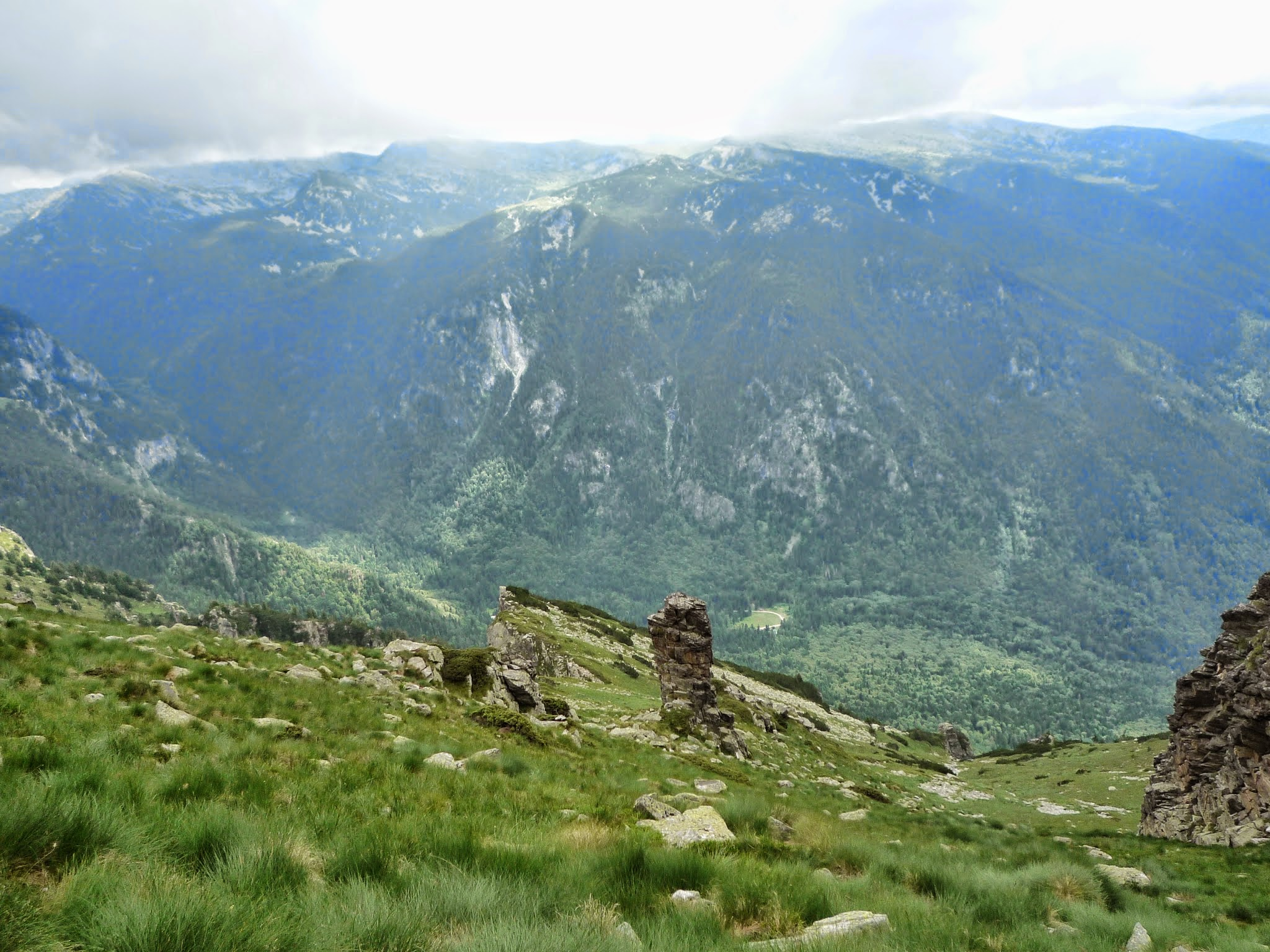
A view of Kirilova Polyana from above

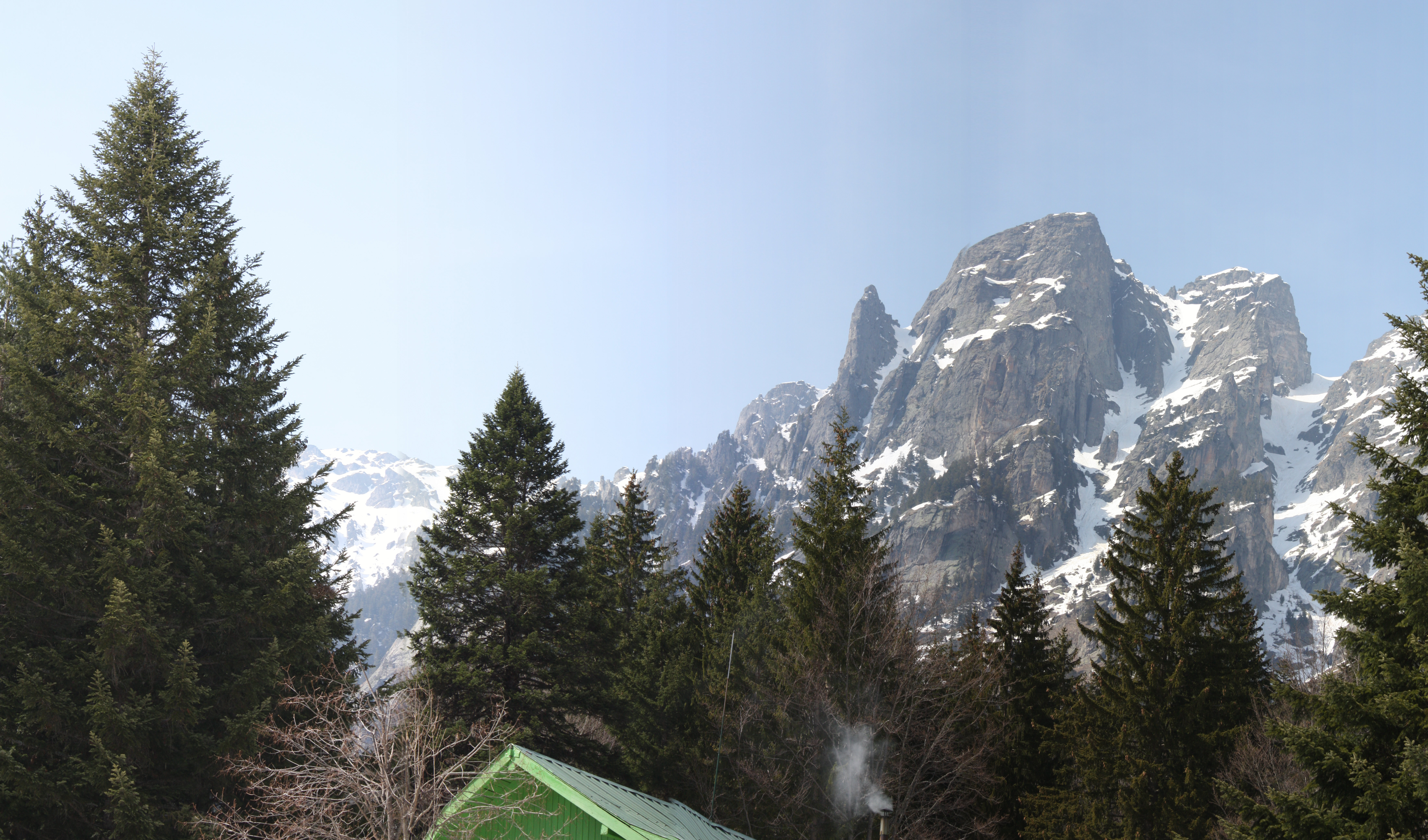
A view to Zlia Zab, Dvuglav and Iglata

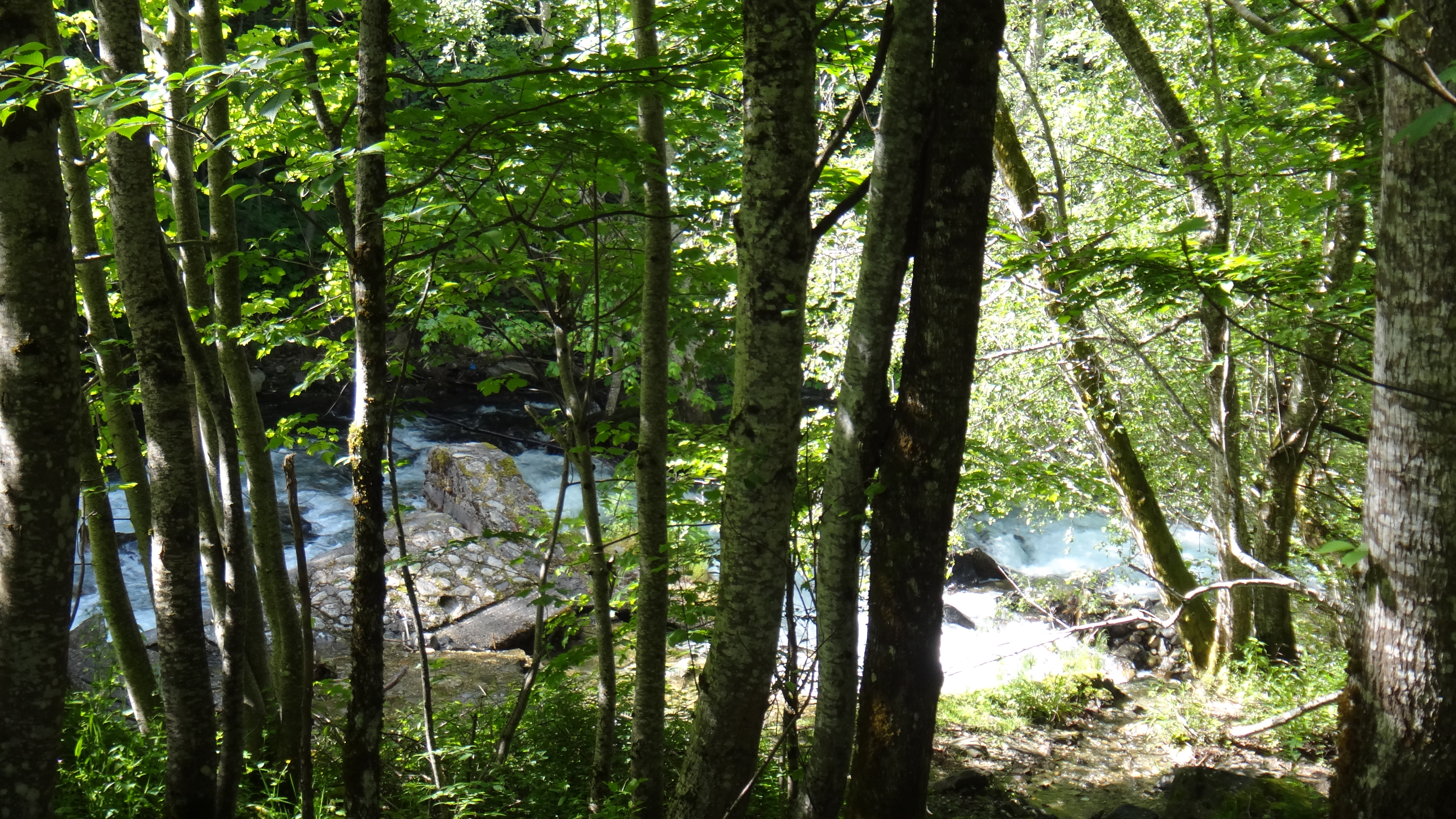
A stream
