= Padala, Bulgaria =

Village in Rila municipality, Kyustendil oblast, Bulgaria

Padala is a village in Western Bulgaria, located in the Municipality of Rila, Kyustendil Province. Its population is 11 people as of 31 December 2025

== Geography ==
It is located in the foothills of the Rila mountains, at an elevation of around 1100 m.
