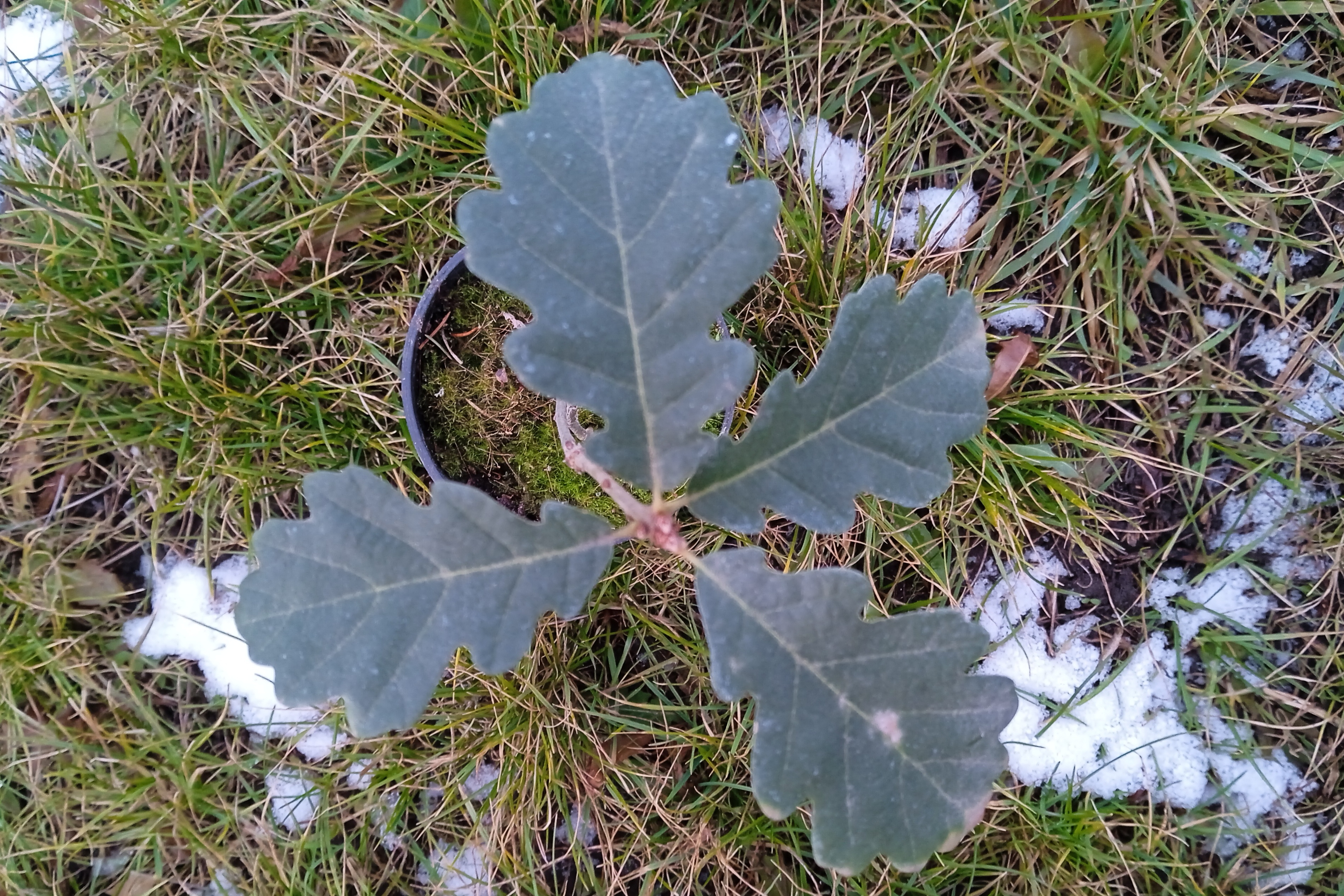
- Quercus protoroburoides seedling

Conservation status
- Data Deficient (IUCN 3.1)

Scientific classification
- Kingdom: Plantae
- Clade: Embryophytes
- Clade: Tracheophytes
- Clade: Spermatophytes
- Clade: Angiosperms
- Clade: Eudicots
- Clade: Rosids
- Order: Fagales
- Family: Fagaceae
- Genus: Quercus
- Subgenus: Quercus subg. Quercus
- Section: Quercus sect. Quercus
- Species: Q. protoroburoides

Binomial name
- Quercus protoroburoides Donchev & Bouzov ex Tashev & Tsavkov

= Quercus protoroburoides =

Species of oak tree

Quercus protoroburoides, the Rila oak (Bulgarian: рилски дъб), is a deciduous species of oak endemic to the Rila Mountains of southwestern Bulgaria. Within Rila, the species is distributed only in five localities on steep, rocky south-facing slopes of the Rilska River valley, at the tree line between 1,500 to 1,750 metres (4,920 to 5,740 feet) above sea level. The Rila oak was first discovered in 1968 and officially accepted as a distinct species in 2017.

Quercus protoroburoides grows scattered or in small groups, higher than the local sessile oak (Quercus petraea) or fir-beech forests. In terms of morphology, it most closely resembles the Strandzha oak (Quercus hartwissiana) and the sessile oak, but it has a specific leaf epidermis and a very distinct distribution. Trunk diameter ranges from 30 to 100 cm (12 to 39 in) and the tree height reaches over 20 m (66 ft) in favourable locations.

The Rila oak forests are listed in the Red Data Book of the Republic of Bulgaria as a critically endangered habitat. The species is protected as part of the Rila Monastery Nature Park and its subordinate nature reserve Rila Monastery Forest.

== Taxonomy ==
Quercus protoroburoides was first discovered in 1968 by the Bulgarian engineer Boris Buzov in the valley of the Rilska River. Initially, it was classified as Quercus macranthera subsp. balcanica by Zhelez Dontchev and Buzov in 1969, but this name was not validly published according to the International Code of Nomenclature for algae, fungi, and plants due to the absence of a Latin diagnosis and type specimen designation.

In 1981, the same researchers reconsidered the taxonomic placement of this oak and elevated it to species rank, proposing the name Quercus protoroburoides. However, this name also remained invalid for the same reasons until 2017, when Alexander Tashev and Evgeni Tsavkov formally validated it. The species belongs to section Robur within the genus Quercus. Morphological and anatomical studies place Q. protoroburoides closest to Q. hartwissiana (Strandzha Oak), despite their radically different habitats and geographical distributions. The species epithet protoroburoides reflects the opinion of the species' discoverers Dontchev and Bouzov that the Rila oak is ancestral to all roburoid oaks. This is based on the species' geographic isolation and morphological features shared among many oaks of the Robur subsection. Comparative studies of leaf epidermis have shown that Q. protoroburoides combines characteristics of both Q. dalechampii and Q. pedunculiflora, featuring stellate trichomes with varying numbers of rays (2–4 and 6–7, respectively). The species also shares certain epidermis traits with Q. hartwissiana, though Q. protoroburoides has a thicker cuticle and displays unique asymmetrical coalescence patterns in its stellate trichomes that have not been observed in other Quercus taxa on the Balkan Peninsula.
