= Rafail's Cross =

Rafail's Cross is a famous wooden crucifix at Rila Monastery in Bulgaria.

The crucifix is a wooden cross made from a single piece of wood (81 х 43 cm). It was whittled down by a monk named Rafail using fine burins and magnifying lenses to recreate 104 religious scenes and 650 miniature figures. Work on this piece of art lasted not less than 12 years before it was completed in 1802 when the monk lost his sight.
