= Rila, Bulgaria =

Rila Рила
- Town
- Location of Rila
- Coordinates: 42°08′N 23°08′E
- Country: Bulgaria
- Province (Oblast): Kyustendil
- Municipality: Rila

Government
  - Mayor: Georgi Kabzimalski
- Elevation: 593 m (1,946 ft)

Population (2008)
  - Total: 3,044
- Time zone: UTC+2 (EET)
  - Summer (DST): UTC+3 (EEST)
- Postal Code: 2630
- Area code: 07054

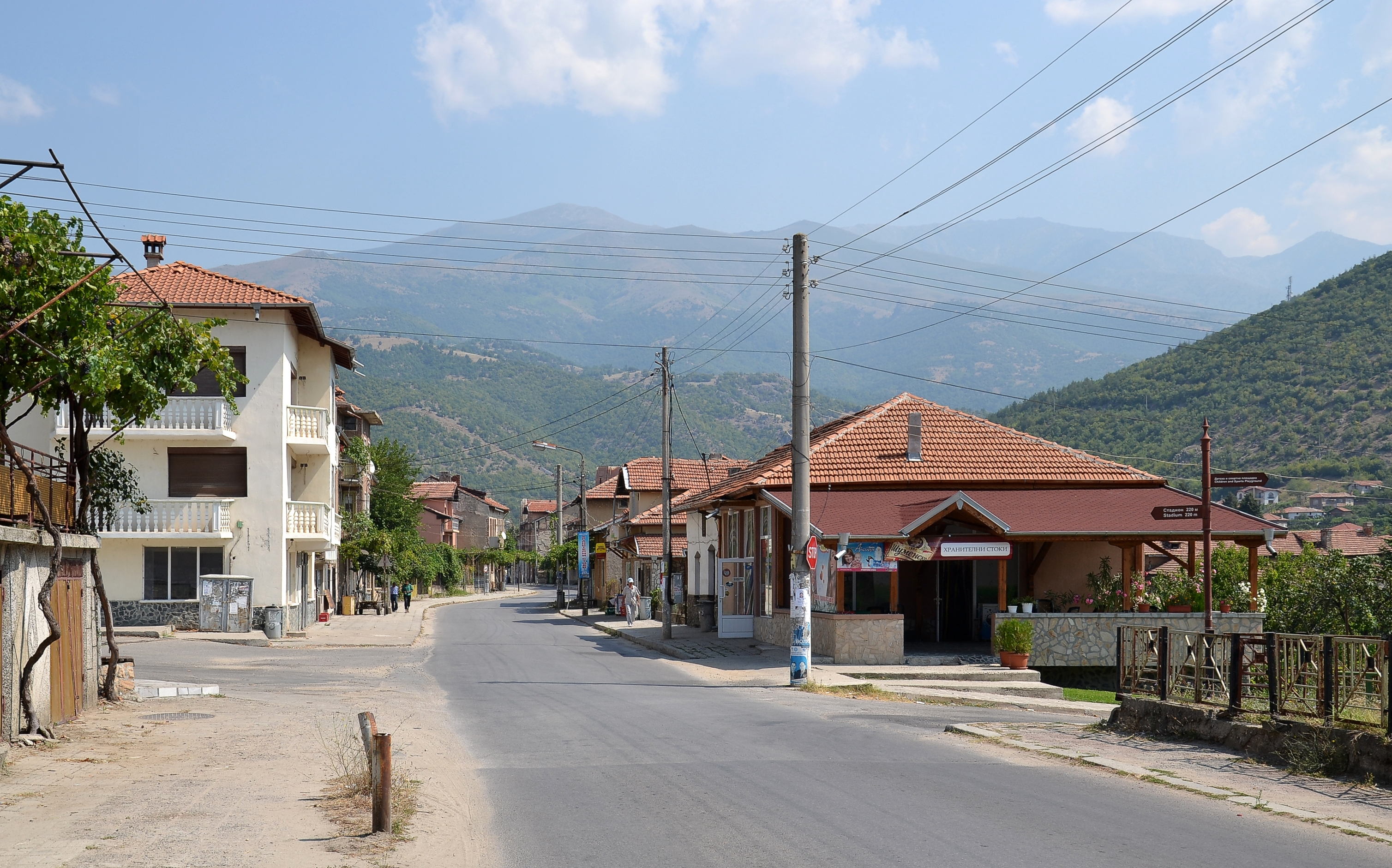
Main street in town Rila

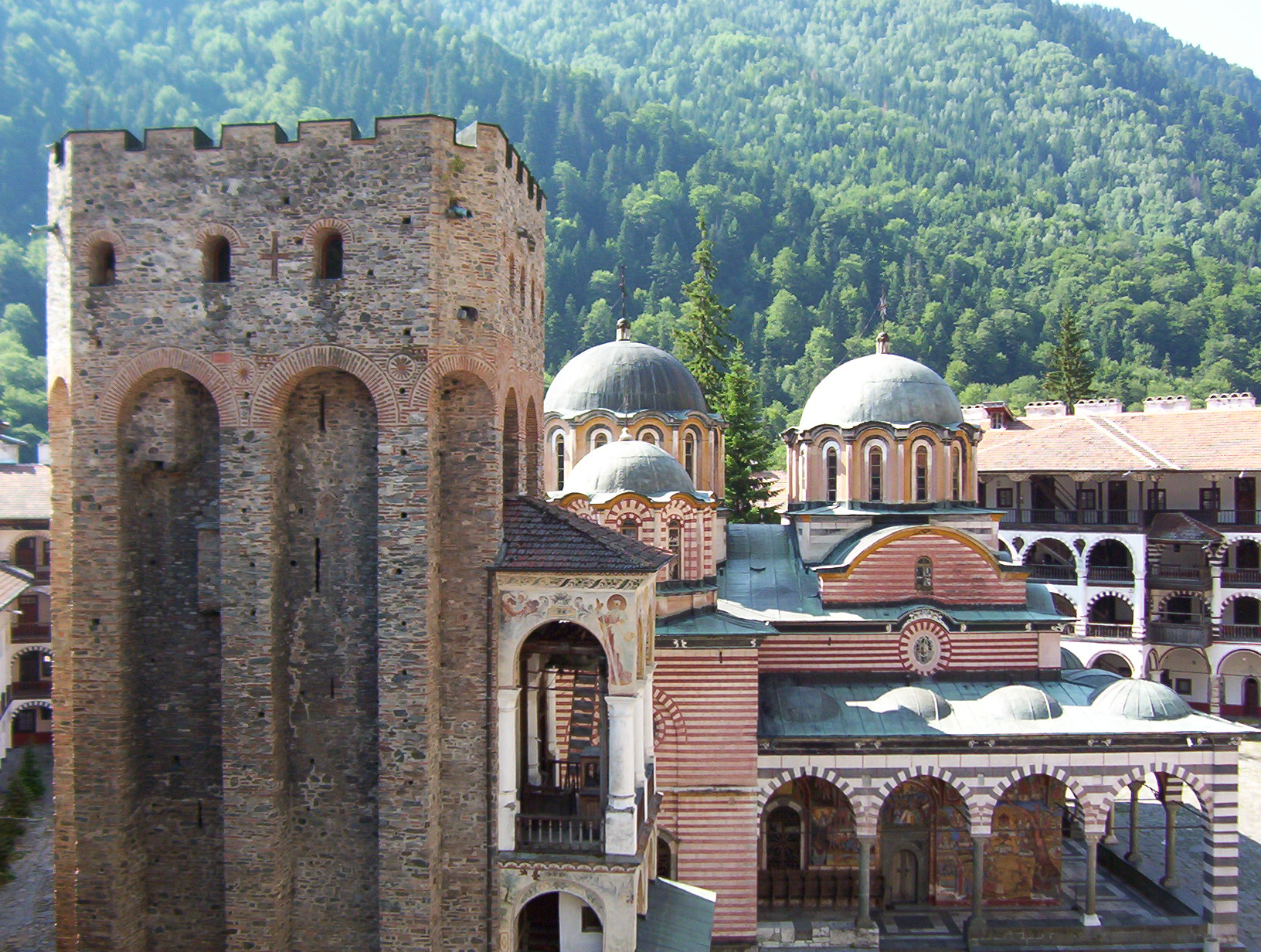
Rila Monastery

Rila (Bulgarian: Рила, pronounced [ˈriɫɐ]) is a town in southwestern Bulgaria, the administrative centre of Rila Municipality, in the southeastern part of Kyustendil Province.

The town lies in a mountainous region at the foot of the southwestern Rila Mountains, 20 km (12 mi) from the Rila Monastery, 34 km (21 mi) from Dupnitsa, and 65 km (40 mi) from Kyustendil. It is situated on the banks of the Rilska River at the entrance of the Rila Monastery Nature Park. In antiquity, the area was inhabited by the Thracians and Romans; it was known as Sportela and then as Roligera. In the Middle Ages it was part of the Bulgarian Empire. In the 14th century, the village was a feudal possession of the Rila Monastery and may have been mentioned in Tsar Ivan Shishman of Bulgaria's Rila Charter as Driska. Later on, it was mentioned as İrlie in Ottoman tax registers of 1576.
