= Rila Municipality =

Coordinates: 42°8′N 23°8′E

Rila Municipality Община Рила
- Municipality
- Interactive map of Rila Municipality
- Country: Bulgaria
- Province: Kyustendil Province
- Seat: Rila

Area
  - Total: 360.96 km^{2} (139.37 sq mi)

Population
  - Total: 3,190
  - Density: 8.84/km^{2} (22.9/sq mi)

Rila Municipality (Bulgarian: Рила) is located in southeastern Kyustendil Province, Bulgaria. Its administrative centre is Rila. The municipality covers an area of 361 square kilometres (139 sq mi), of which 54.84% is forests; only 19.3% is arable.. As of 2009, the population was 3,606.

Locations in Rila Municipality include:

- Padala
- Pastra
- Rila (administrative centre)
- Rila Monastery
- Smochevo

Several peaks higher than 2,000 metres are part of the municipality, including Rilets (2,731 m), Yosifitsa (2,697 m), Kanarata (2,619 m), Zliya Zab (2,678 m), Kalin (2,667 m), Elenin Vrah (2,654 m) and Tsarev Vrah (2,378 m). The municipality also boasts 28 mountain lakes. The area is also rich in medieval Bulgarian Orthodox churches and monasteries.

== Demography ==
=== Religion ===
According to the latest Bulgarian census of 2011, the religious composition, among those who answered the optional question on religious identification, was the following:

Religious composition of Rila Municipality
Orthodox Christianity	91.6%
Catholicism	0.9%
Protestantism	0.7%
Islam	0.4%
No religion	1.6%
Prefer not to answer, others and indefinable	4.8%
