= Milanovo =

Milanovo may refer to:

- Milanovo, Sofia Province, a village in Bulgaria
- Milanovo (Leskovac), a village in Serbia
- Milanovo (Vranje), a village in Serbia
