= List of rock formations in Bulgaria =

Geographic map of Bulgaria

Bulgaria is a country in south-eastern Europe situated in the north-eastern part of the Balkan Peninsula. The country has a great variety of topographical features and diverse landscape ranging from the Alpine snow-capped peaks in Rila, Pirin and the Balkan Mountains to the mild and sunny Black Sea coast; from the typically continental Danubian Plain in the north to the strong Mediterranean climatic influence in the valleys of Macedonia and the lowlands in the southernmost parts of Thrace. The diverse morphological, climatic and hydrological conditions of Bulgaria favour the formation of a large number of geological features.

== Partial list of rock formations in Bulgaria ==
Sites included in the 100 Tourist Sites of Bulgaria

Name	Image	Description	Location within Bulgaria
Belintash		Belintash is a small plateau in the Rhodope Mountains bearing traces of human activity. The plateau is 750 m long, up to 50 m wide and 35 m high. It is assumed that Belintash was a cult site of the ancient Thracians, though the very essence and purpose are not yet fully understood. Belintash is situated near the village of Sini Vrah in Plovdiv Province. It was declared a natural landmark in 2013.	List of rock formations in Bulgaria is located in Bulgaria
Belogradchik Rocks		Belogradchik Rocks are an extensive group of strange shaped sandstone and conglomerate rock formations located on the western slopes of the Balkan Mountains near the town of Belogradchik in Vidin Province. The rocks vary in colour from primarily red to yellow; some of the rocks reach up to 200 m in height. Many rocks have fantastic shapes and are associated with interesting legends. Belogradchik Rocks have been declared a natural landmark in 1949 and are a major tourist attraction in the region. They are included in the 100 Tourist Sites of Bulgaria under No. 15.	List of rock formations in Bulgaria is located in Bulgaria
Bozhi Most		Bozhi Most (God's Bridge) is a natural arch situated in a karst region in the western Balkan Mountains. Bozhi Most is 20 m high and 25 m wide. It was declared a natural landmark in 1964. It is situated in Vratsa Province between the villages Chiren and Lilyache.	List of rock formations in Bulgaria is located in Bulgaria
Buynovo Gorge		Buynovsko Gorge is a narrow and steep canyon, up to 350 m deep and with a total length of 9,5 km. It is situated along the Byunovska River in the southern Rhodope Mountains between the village of Teshel and Yagodinska cave. There are numerous rock formations along the gorge, including four stone arches and 34 caves. It was declared a natural landmark in 1971. The gorge is included in the 100 Tourist Sites of Bulgaria under No. 89.	List of rock formations in Bulgaria is located in Bulgaria
Chudnite Skali		Chudnite Skali (The Wonderful Rocks) are situated on the banks of the Tsonevo Reservoir at a distance of 4 km from the village of Asparuhovo, Varna Province. Chudnite Skali are a massif of about ten rock needles, 40–50 meters high, shaped like castle towers. They were formed as a result of water and wind erosion on the local limestone rocks.	List of rock formations in Bulgaria is located in Bulgaria
Iskar Gorge		Iskar Gorge is Bulgaria's longest and largest gorge with a total length of 67 km along the valley of Iskar River. The gorge passes through the Balkan Mountains and is situated between the town of Novi Iskar in Sofia City Province and the village of Lyutibrod in Vratsa Province. Along the densely wooded gorge are located a number of rock formations, caves and waterfalls, as well as monasteries and villa zones.	List of rock formations in Bulgaria is located in Bulgaria
Kardzhali Earth Pyramids		Kardzhali Earth Pyramids are a geomorphological structure in the eastern Rhodope Mountains formed 40 million years ago. The most recognizable rock formation is the Petrified Wedding near the village of Zimzelen, Kardzhali Province –- a group of stone figures up to 10 m high that resemble people, animals and other shapes, centred around two rock formations resembling a groom and a bride. Kardzhali Earth Pyramids were declared a natural landmark in 1974.	List of rock formations in Bulgaria is located in Bulgaria
Kominite		Kominite (The Chimneys) are several andesite peaks in the Vitosha Mountains to the south of Bulgaria's capital Sofia. The peaks are situated in the upper valley of the Dragalevska River near the Bay Krastyo tourist site. The peaks are the nearest and most easily accessible climbing area to Sofia, with climbing routes of UIAA categories II to VIII. They are 50 to 100 m high. The most convenient access to Kominite is from Sofia's neighbourhood Dragalevtsi via Bay Krastyo or Goli Vrah chair lift stations.	List of rock formations in Bulgaria is located in Bulgaria
Lakatnik Rocks		Lakatnik Rocks are situated along the left slope of the Iskar Gorge in the western Balkan Mountains. They are located near the village of Milanovo, Sofia Province. The rocks are made of red sandstone and limestone. They are almost vertical and reach a height of up to 250 from the waters of the river Iskar. Lakatnik Rocks are situated in an extensive karst region and contain a number of caves. They were declared a natural landmark in 1966 and since 1989 are part of Vrachanski Balkan Nature Park.	List of rock formations in Bulgaria is located in Bulgaria
Melnik Earth Pyramids		Melnik Earth Pyramids are situated in the foothills of the Pirin Mountain in south-western Bulgaria, spanning an area of 17 km^{2} near Melnik, Karlanovo and Rozhen. Blagoevgrad Province. Reaching a height of up to 100 m these sandstone pyramids are shaped in forms, resembling giant mushrooms, ancient towers and obelisks. Melnik Earth Pyramids are a geological phenomenon of global importance and were declared a natural landmark in 1960.	List of rock formations in Bulgaria is located in Bulgaria
Pobiti Kamani		Pobiti Kamani is a rock formation located in eastern Bulgaria near the town of Beloslav to the west of Varna. It consists of several groups of natural rock formations on a total area of 7 km^{2}. The formations are mainly stone columns between 5 and 7 m high and from 0.3 to 3 m thick. The columns do not have solid foundations, but are instead hollow and filled with sand, and look like they are stuck into the surrounding sands, which gives the phenomenon its name. Pobiti Kamani was designated a natural landmark in 1937.	List of rock formations in Bulgaria is located in Bulgaria
Ritlite		Ritlite are a group of limestone rock formations situated in the northern section of the Iskar Gorge on the right bank of the river Iskar near the village of Lyutibrod, Vratsa Province. The rocks reach a height of 80 m; they are 3 to 7 m thick and 200 to 400 m long. Ritlite were formed 120 million year ago. They were declared a natural landmark in 1938.	List of rock formations in Bulgaria is located in Bulgaria
Stob Earth Pyramids		Stob Earth Pyramids are a set of earth pyramids located 7 km to the northeast of the village of Stob, Kyustendil Province. They are rock formations up to 12 m high and around 40 cm thick at the base. They vary in shape from sharp through conical to mushroomlike. Some of the columns are topped by flat stones. Groups of individual pyramids have been named the Towers, the Pinnacles and the Samodiva Chimneys. Stob Earth Pyramids were designated a natural landmark in 1964.	List of rock formations in Bulgaria is located in Bulgaria
Stone Mushrooms		The Stone Mushrooms is a rock phenomenon near the village of Beli plast in Kardzhali Province, on the road between Haskovo and Kardzhali. They reach a height of about 2.5 –- 3m. The Stone Mushrooms were designated a natural landmark in 1974.	List of rock formations in Bulgaria is located in Bulgaria
Tran Gorge		Tran Gorge is situated along the course of the river Erma in westernmost Bulgaria near the border with Serbia, at 3.5 km north of the town of Tran, Pernik Province. Its walls are almost vertical reaching a height of 120 m. It was declared a natural landmark in 1974. The gorge is included in the 100 Tourist Sites of Bulgaria under No. 39.	List of rock formations in Bulgaria is located in Bulgaria
Trigrad Gorge		Trigrad Gorge is a canyon of vertical marble rocks in the western Rhodope Mountains. It is located at 1.2 km from the village of Trigrad, Smolyan Province. The gorge is 7 km long and follows the course of the Trigrad River, which plunges into the Devil's Throat Cave and 530 m further emerges as a large karst spring. The gorge's walls reach a height of up to 200 m. There are around 150 in the vicinity of the gorge which are important sanctuaries for bats. It was declared a natural landmark in 1963. The gorge is included in the 100 Tourist Sites of Bulgaria under No. 88.	List of rock formations in Bulgaria is located in Bulgaria
Wonderful Bridges		The Wonderful Bridges are natural arches in the Rhodope Mountains of southern Bulgaria. They are located in the karst valley of the Erkyupriya river at an altitude of 1,450 m. There are two natural bridges. The larger is 15 m wide and 96 metres long, and consists of three vaulted arches, the largest of which is 45 metres high and 40 metres wide. The smaller bridge is located 200 m downstream. They were declared a natural landmark in 1961. The Wonderful Bridges are included in the 100 Tourist Sites of Bulgaria under No. 85.	List of rock formations in Bulgaria is located in Bulgaria
Zlatnite Mostove		Zlatnite Mostove (The Golden Bridges) is the largest stone river in Vitosha Mountain. It is situated in the valley of Vladayska River, extending 2.2 km, and up to 150 m wide, with several ‘tributary’ stone rivers. The stone river is "descending" from an elevation of 1800 m above sea level to 1410 m. The lower reaches of the stone river is a popular tourist destination accessible from Sofia by road. The name Golden Bridges derives from the golden colour of the lichens growing on the surface of stone run boulders.	List of rock formations in Bulgaria is located in Bulgaria

== See also ==
- Geography of Bulgaria
- List of protected areas of Bulgaria
- List of mountains in Bulgaria
- List of caves in Bulgaria
- List of islands of Bulgaria
- List of lakes of Bulgaria

== Sources ==
=== References ===
- Дончев (Donchev), Дончо (Doncho); Христо Каракашев (Hristo Karakashev) (2004). Теми по физическа и социално-икономическа география на България [Topics on Physical and Social-Economic Geography of Bulgaria] (in Bulgarian). Sofia: Ciela. ISBN 954-649-717-7.

=== External links ===
- "Geologic Phenomena of Bulgaria" (in Bulgarian).
- "Official Site of the 100 Tourist Sites of Bulgaria" (in Bulgarian).
