= List of caves in Bulgaria =

Topographic map of Bulgaria

The list caves in Bulgaria, as of 2002, includes around 4,500 underground formations. The earliest written records about the caves in Bulgaria are found in the manuscripts of the 17th century Bulgarian Catholic figure and historian Petar Bogdan. The first Bulgarian speleological society was established in 1929. The caves in the country are inhabited by more than 700 invertebrate species, many of them endemic, and 32 of the 37 species of bats found in Europe.

The longest caves in Bulgaria are Kolkina Dupka (19,164 m), Duhlata (18,200 m) and Orlova Chuka (13,437 m). The first show cave is Bacho Kiro, inaugurated in 1937. Nowadays, there are 10 tourist caves accessible to the public for guided visits in Bulgaria.

== Partial list of Bulgarian caves ==
Name	Image	Notes	Length	Location
Bacho Kiro		Bacho Kiro is situated in the central Balkan Mountains, at 5 km to the west of the town Dryanovo, Gabrovo Province and at only 300 m from the Dryanovo Monastery. It was the first show cave in Bulgaria and was opened to the public in 1937. Listed in the 100 Tourist Sites of Bulgaria under No. 22.	3,500 m	List of caves in Bulgaria is located in Bulgaria
Devetashka		Devetashka Cave is situated on the east bank of the river Osam in the pre-Balkan area near the village of Devetaki, Lovech Province at around 7 km east of Letnitsa and 15 km north-east of Lovech. The cave used to be a secret military site. The site was used for filming The Expendables 2. Listed in the 100 Tourist Sites of Bulgaria under No. 30.	2,442 m	List of caves in Bulgaria is located in Bulgaria
Devil's Throat		The Devil's Throat Cave is situated in the Trigrad Gorge of the western Rhodope Mountains. It is located at 1.5 km of the village of Trigrad, Smolyan Province. The cave has the largest population of common bent-wing bat in the Balkans. Listed in the 100 Tourist Sites of Bulgaria along with Trigrad Gorge under No. 88.	548 m	List of caves in Bulgaria is located in Bulgaria
Duhlata		Duhlata is situated in the south-western part of the Vitosha mountain range on the left bank of the river Struma near the village of Bosnek, Pernik Province. It is the longest cave in Bulgaria reaching 18,200 m. Duhlata is home to 22 known animal taxa, including six bat species.	18,200 m	List of caves in Bulgaria is located in Bulgaria
Kolkina Dupka		Kolkina Dupka is situated in the western Balkan Mountains near the village of Zimevitsa, Sofia Province. As of 2018 it has a depth of -541 m, making it the deepest cave in Bulgaria; the explored galleries reach 10,300 m, placing it third in the country. Exploration is still ongoing.	19,164 m	List of caves in Bulgaria is located in Bulgaria
Kozarnika		Kozarnika is situated on the northern slopes of the western Balkan Mountains at 6 km from the town of Belogradchik, Vidin Province. It is an important archaeological site and was used as a shelter early humans 1.6 million years ago.	218 m	List of caves in Bulgaria is located in Bulgaria
Ledenika		Ledenika is situated in the western Balkan Mountains at 16 km from the city of Vratsa, Vratsa Province. It features an abundance of galleries and impressive karst formations including stalactites and stalagmites, and is known to contain icicles. Ledenika falls within the territory of Vrachanski Balkan Nature Park. Listed in the 100 Tourist Sites of Bulgaria under No. 16.	320 m	List of caves in Bulgaria is located in Bulgaria
Lepenitsa		Lepenitsa is situated in the western Rhodope Mountains, at 17 km south of the town Rakitovo, Pazardzhik Province. It was three levels with numerous cave formations and features, including an underground river and sinter lakes. Lepenitsa has a rich fauna, including four species endemic to the cave. Listed in the 100 Tourist Sites of Bulgaria under No. 55A.	1,525 m	List of caves in Bulgaria is located in Bulgaria
Magura		Magura is situated on the northern slopes of the western Balkan Mountains near the village of Rabisha, Vidin Province. It contains prehistoric wall painting dated between 10,000 and 8,000 years ago. In 1984 the site was added to UNESCO's World Heritage Sites tentative list. Listed in the 100 Tourist Sites of Bulgaria under No. 14.	2,608 m	List of caves in Bulgaria is located in Bulgaria
Orlova Chuka		Orlova Chuka is situated on the left slopes of the Cherni Lom river valley. It is located at 11 km to the east of the town of Dve Mogili and 3 km to north of the village of Pepelina, Ruse Province. The entrance terrace provides a scenic overlook of Rusenski Lom Nature Park and the rock formations of the river valley. Orlova Chuka is the second longest cave in Bulgaria.	13,437 m	List of caves in Bulgaria is located in Bulgaria
Prohodna		Prohodna is situated in the pre-Balkan area in the Karlukovo Gorge of the Iskar River. It is located near the village of Karlukovo, Lovech Province. It is part of the Iskar-Panega Geopark and is most notable for the two equal-sized holes in the ceiling of its middle chamber, resembling eyes. The cave is featured in several movies, including the 1988 Time of Violence.	262 m	List of caves in Bulgaria is located in Bulgaria
Raychova Dupka		Raychova Dupka is situated on the northern slopes of the central Balkan Mountains within Steneto Reserve in Central Balkan National Park. The nearest settlement of the village of Cherni Osam, Lovech Province. Reaching depth of -377 m, it is the second deepest cave discovered in Bulgaria.	3,333 m	List of caves in Bulgaria is located in Bulgaria
Razhishka		Razhishka Cave is situated in the western Balkan Mountains overlooking the left bank of the Iskar River in the homonymous gorge at a height of 140 m over the river. It is located near the village of Milanovo, Sofia Province. It was inhabited by humans during the Iron Age.	316 m	List of caves in Bulgaria is located in Bulgaria
Saeva dupka		Saeva dupka is situated in the pre-Balkan area near the village of Brestnitsa, Lovech Province. It was desclared a natural landmark in 1963. Listed in the 100 Tourist Sites of Bulgaria under No. 33.	210 m	List of caves in Bulgaria is located in Bulgaria
Snezhanka		Snezhanka is situated in the western Rhodope Mountains in the valley of Stara Reka river at some 5 km from the town of Peshtera, Pazardzhik Province. The cave is rich in stalactites, stalagmites, draperies and sinter lakes. Listed in the 100 Tourist Sites of Bulgaria under No. 37.	368 m	List of caves in Bulgaria is located in Bulgaria
Temnata Dupka		Temnata Dupka is situated in the western Balkan Mountains overlooking the left bank of the Iskar River in the homonymous gorge. It is located near the villages of Milanovo and Gara Lakatnik, Sofia Province. It was declared a national landmark in 1962 and falls within the territory of Vrachanski Balkan Nature Park.	9,000 m	List of caves in Bulgaria is located in Bulgaria
Uhlovitsa		Uhlovitsa is situated in the western Rhodope Mountains near the village of Mogilitsa, Smolyan Province. The cave features many underground waterfalls and lakes. Listed in the 100 Tourist Sites of Bulgaria under No. 84.	330 m	List of caves in Bulgaria is located in Bulgaria
Venetsa		Venetsa is situated in the western Balkan Mountains, at 14 km to the east of the town of Belogradchik and 3 km to the south of the village of Gara Oreshets, Vidin Province. It was opened for tourists in 2015 and is the most recently inaugurated show cave in Bulgaria.	220 m	List of caves in Bulgaria is located in Bulgaria
Yagodinska		Yagodinska Cave is situated in the western Rhodope Mountains in the Buynovo Gorge near the village of Yagodina, Smolyan Province. It is the longest cave in the Rhodope Mountains and contains a very large number of cave formations, including the rare cave pearls. Listed in the 100 Tourist Sites of Bulgaria under No. 89.	8,501 m	List of caves in Bulgaria is located in Bulgaria
Zandana		Zandana, also known as Biserna, is the largest cave in the Shumen Plateau within Shumen Plateau Nature Park. It is situated at 1 km west from the city of Shumen, Shumen Province. The cave has two levels, with a river flowing though the lower level. It is rich in cave formation and in 2019 800 m of its passages were adapted as a show cave open to visitors. There are 14 bat species.	2,706 m	List of caves in Bulgaria is located in Bulgaria

== See also ==
- Geography of Bulgaria
- List of caves
- List of protected areas of Bulgaria
- List of mountains in Bulgaria
- List of rock formations in Bulgaria
- List of islands of Bulgaria
- List of lakes of Bulgaria
- Speleology

== Sources ==
- Caves in Bulgaria
