= Chuypetlovo =

Chuypetlovo Чуйпетлово
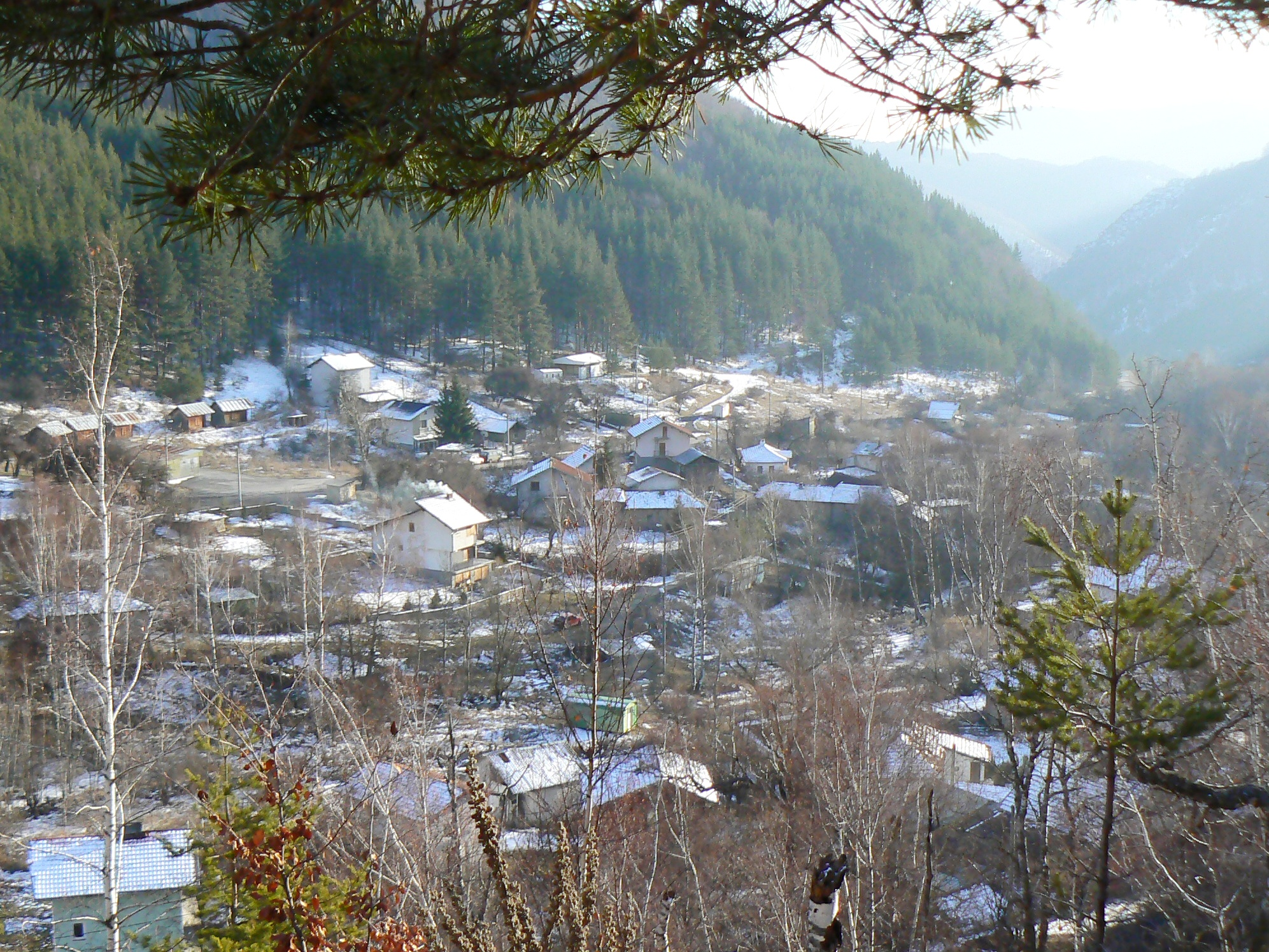
- Chuypetlovo and the upper Struma Valley

- Location of Chuypetlovo
- Coordinates: 42°31′N 23°15′E
- Country: Bulgaria
- Provinces (Oblast): Pernik

Government
  - Mayor: Rositsa Ianakieva
- Elevation: 1,436 m (4,711 ft)

Population (2013)
  - Total: 25
- Time zone: UTC+2 (EET)
  - Summer (DST): UTC+3 (EEST)
- Postal Code: 2346
- License plate: B

Chuypetlovo (Bulgarian: Чуйпетлово, "Hear the rooster") is a village in the Pernik municipality of Pernik Province, western Bulgaria. Its population is 57 as of January 2007.

Chuypetlovo is the only settlement in the interior of Vitosha Mountain, situated at elevation 1,225 m near the head of Struma River valley. Tourist tracks link the village to the Suho Ezero ("Dry Lake") site and Cherni Vrah to the north, Kupena ("Stack") Peak (2195 m) to the east, Yarlovo village to the southeast, Matnitsa River valley and Kladnitsa village to the northwest, and the pulsating spring of Zhiva Voda ("Live Water") to the west. The village is linked by bus service to Bosnek village and the city of Pernik. On the road to Bosnek is the entrance of Bulgaria's longest cave – Duhlata, with a total length of 18,200 m.

Chuypetlovo was established around 1640, and its church of St. Petka was built in 1860. The legend holds it that the name of the village derived from its secluded location, with strangers only founding the settlement as they heard rooster's crow. The village was first mentioned as early as the 16th century, however: it is listed as ЧУИПЄТЄЛЬ in the Urvich Collection. Besides the popular etymology, another scientifically supported theory is that it is a derivation of the personal and family name of a certain Chuyo Petlov.

== Honours ==
Chuypetlovo Knoll in Antarctica is named after Chuypetlovo.
