= Dve Mogili Municipality =

Dve Mogili Municipality Община Две могили
- Municipality
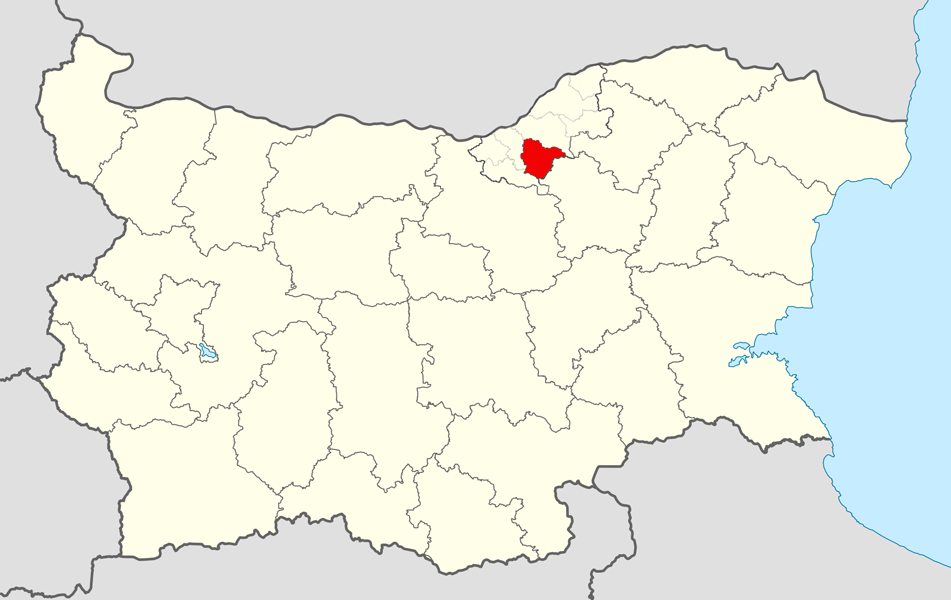
- Dve Mogili Municipality within Bulgaria and Ruse Province.
- Coordinates: 43°33′N 25°55′E
- Country: Bulgaria
- Province (Oblast): Ruse
- Admin. centre (Obshtinski tsentar): Dve Mogili

Area
  - Total: 345 km^{2} (133 sq mi)

Population (December 2009)
  - Total: 10,341
  - Density: 30.0/km^{2} (77.6/sq mi)
- Time zone: UTC+2 (EET)
  - Summer (DST): UTC+3 (EEST)

Dve Mogili Municipality (Bulgarian: Две могили) is a municipality (obshtina) in Ruse Province, Central-North Bulgaria, located in the Danubian Plain, about 15 km southeast of Danube river. It is named after its administrative centre - the town of Dve Mogili.

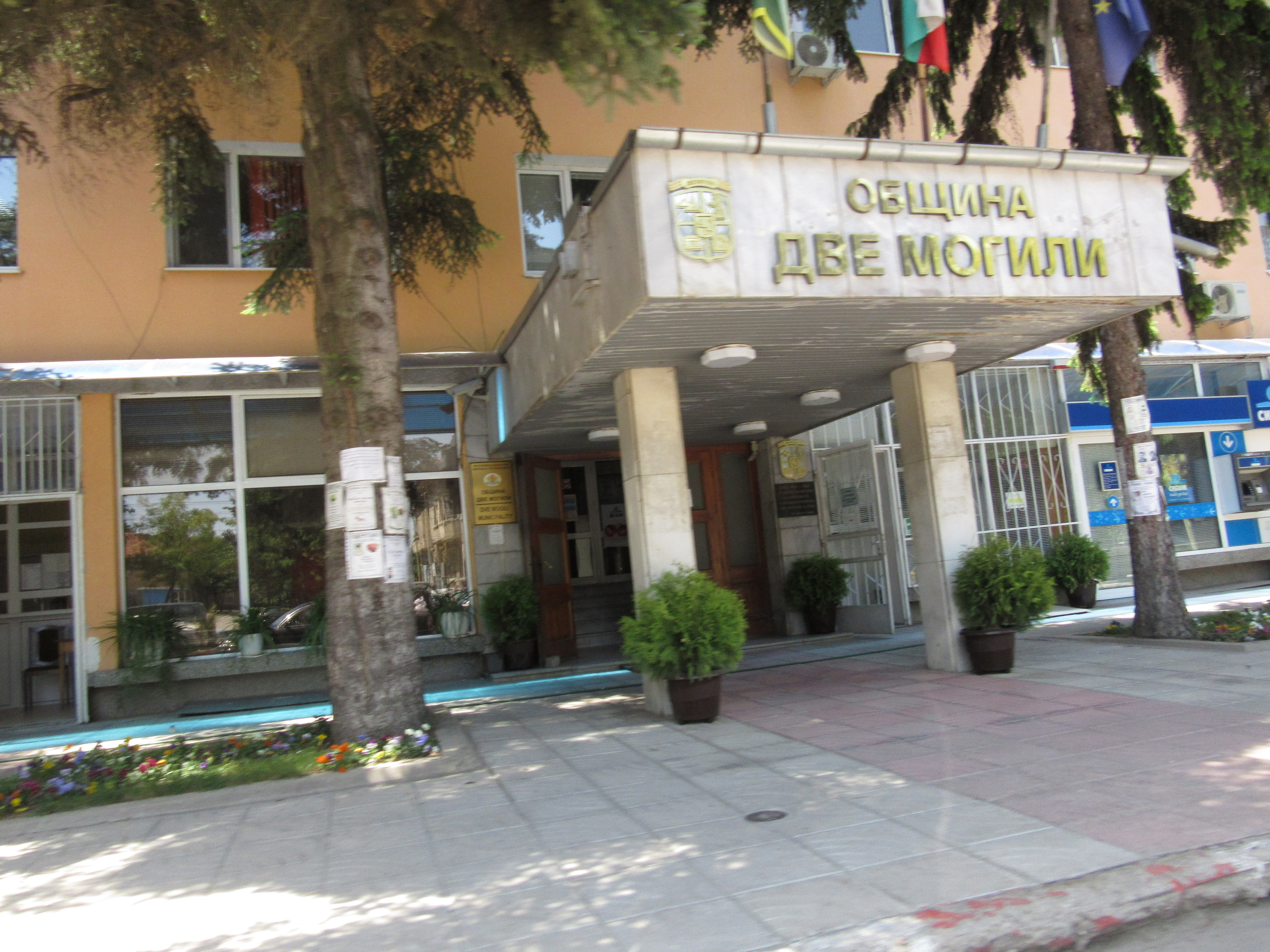
Dve mogili Townhall

The municipality embraces a territory of 345 km^{2} (133 sq mi) with a population of 10,341 inhabitants, as of December 2009.

The area is best known with Orlova Chuka cave. Accidentally discovered in 1941, with its 13,437 m, it is the second-longest in the country.

The main road E85 touches the northwest border of the municipality, connecting the province centre of Ruse with the cities of Veliko Tarnovo and respectively Pleven and Sofia.

== Settlements ==
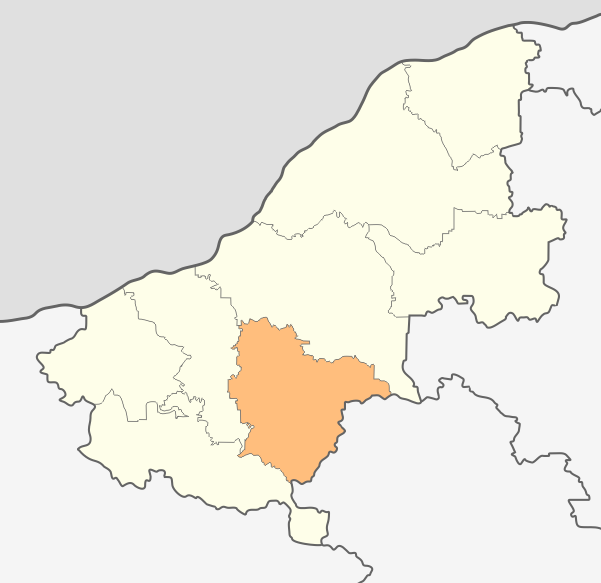
Dve Mogili Municipality within Ruse Province

Dve Mogili Municipality includes the following 12 places (towns are shown in bold):

Town/Village	Cyrillic	Population (December 2009)
**Dve Mogili**	**Две могили**	4,342
Baniska	Баниска	1,291
Bazovets	Бъзовец	938
Batishnitsa	Батишница	709
Chilnov	Чилнов	509
Karan Varbovka	Каран Върбовка	448
Katselovo	Кацелово	841
Mogilino	Могилино	337
Ostritsa	Острица	354
Pomen	Помен	440
Pepelina	Пепелина	30
Shirokovo	Широково	102
Total		10,341

== Demography ==
The following table shows the change of the population during the last four decades.

Dve Mogili Municipality
**Year**	1975	1985	1992	**2001**	2005	2007	2009	**2011**
**Population**	16,876	15,138	14,027	12,116	11,297	10,851	10,341	...
Sources: Census 2001, Census 2011, „pop-stat.mashke.org“,

=== Religion ===
According to the latest Bulgarian census of 2011, the religious composition, among those who answered the optional question on religious identification, was the following:

Religious composition of Dve Mogili Municipality
Orthodox Christianity	63.4%
Catholicism	0.0%
Protestantism	1.0%
Islam	21.1%
No religion	1.9%
Prefer not to answer, others and indefinable	12.6%
