= Orlova Chuka =

Cave in Bulgaria

Orlova Chuka Cave
- Пещера Орлова чука
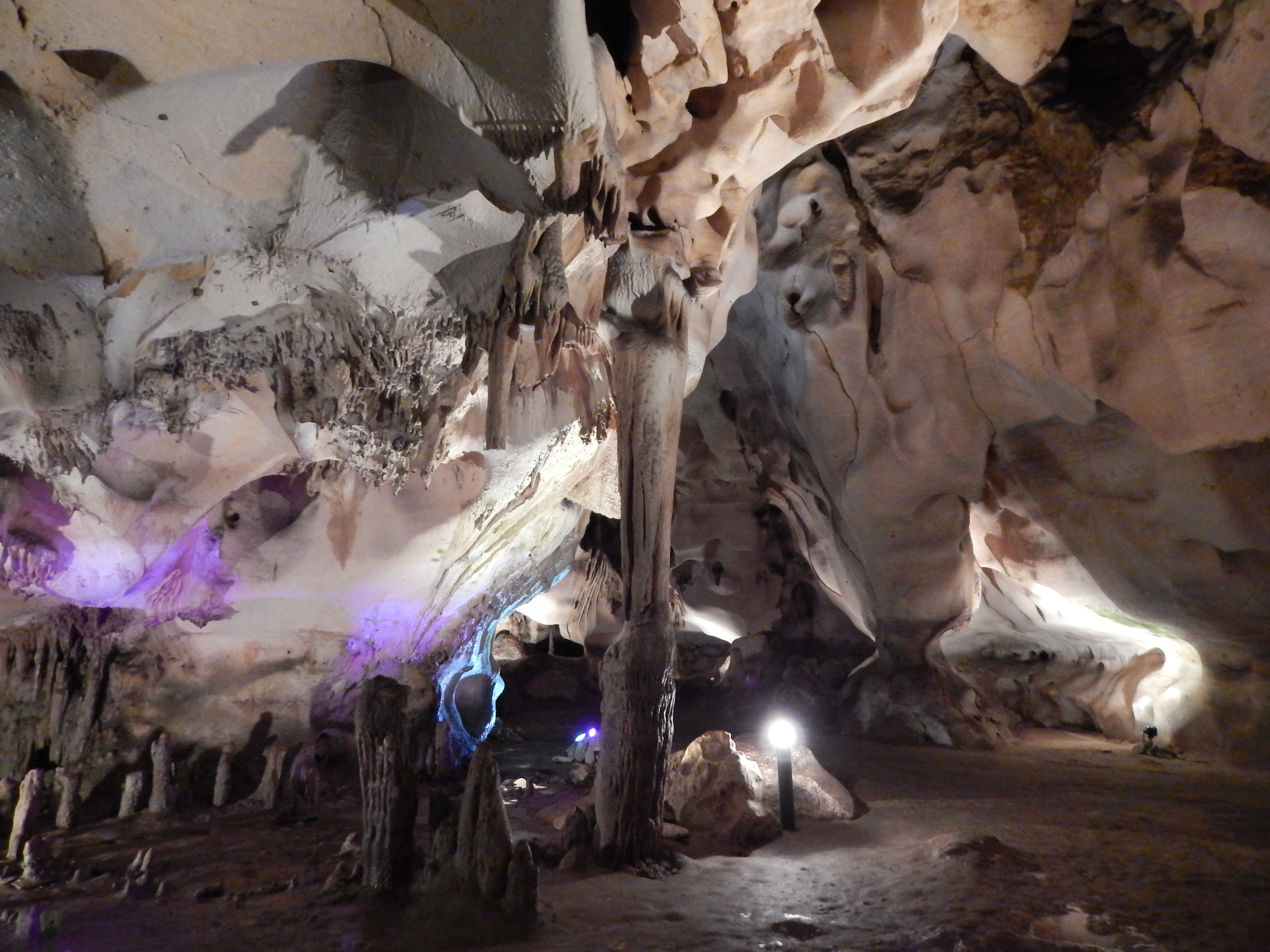
- A view of Orlova Chuka

- Location within Bulgaria
- Location: Dve Mogili, Ruse Province
- Coordinates: 43°35′23.64″N 25°57′37.08″E
- Length: 13,437 m (44,085 ft)
- Height variation: 45 m (148 ft)
- Discovery: 1941
- Show cave opened: 1957; 69 years ago
- Lighting: yes

Orlova Chuka (Bulgarian: Орлова чука) is a cave situated in the Danubian Plain, north-eastern Bulgaria. With a total length of 13,437 m, Orlova Chuka is the second longest cave in the country after Duhlata. The cave was discovered in 1941 and opened for tourists in 1957. Orlova Chuka is home to 14 species of bats.

== Location ==
Orlova Chuka is situated on the left slopes of the Cherni Lom river valley. It is located in Ruse Province at 11 km to the east of the town of Dve Mogili, 3 km to north of the village of Pepelina, and 45 km south of the capital of the province, Ruse. The entrance of the cave is 40 m above the river and is accessible through a steep path. The entrance terrace provides a scenic overlook of the Rusenski Lom Nature Park and the rock formations of the river valley.

== Geology ==
The total length of the cave is 13,437 m, which makes Orlova Chuka the second longest cave in Bulgaria after Duhlata. The cave has a constant year-round temperature of 14 °C.

The cave was formed in the late Pliocene and early Quaternary when it used to be the bed of a subterranean river, carved in the local sedimentary rocks of limestone and sandstone. The cave consists of a complex system of tunnels and halls. The ceiling is mainly smooth due to the underground eddies.

The main sights of the show cave are the Concert Hall, the Big Stalagnate, the Little Chasm and the Golemite Sipei Hall, the largest hall in the cave. Another important landmark is the sinter lake Izvorcheto (the Spring) and its white stalagmites.

== Discovery and exploration ==
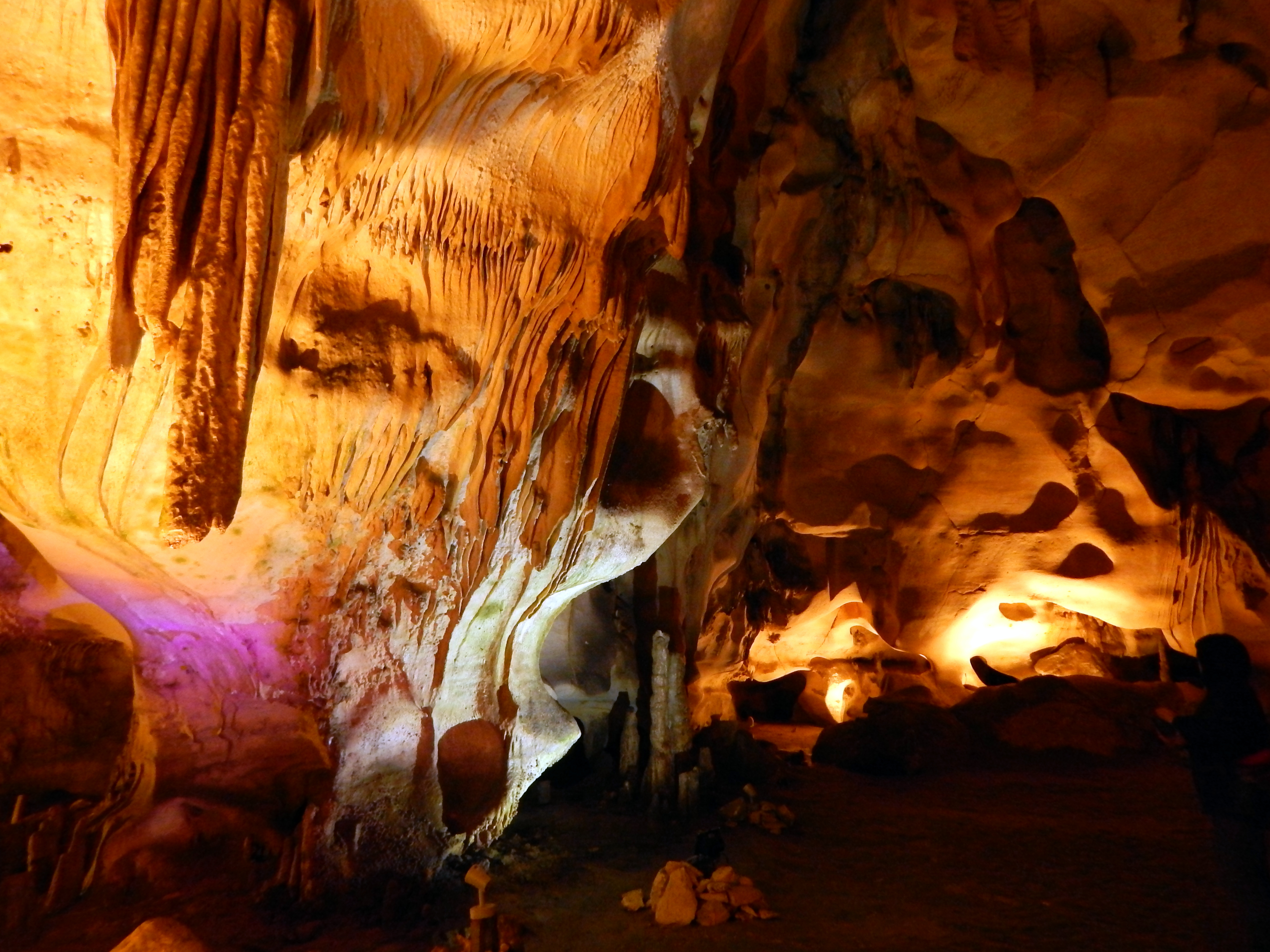
A view of the interior of the cave

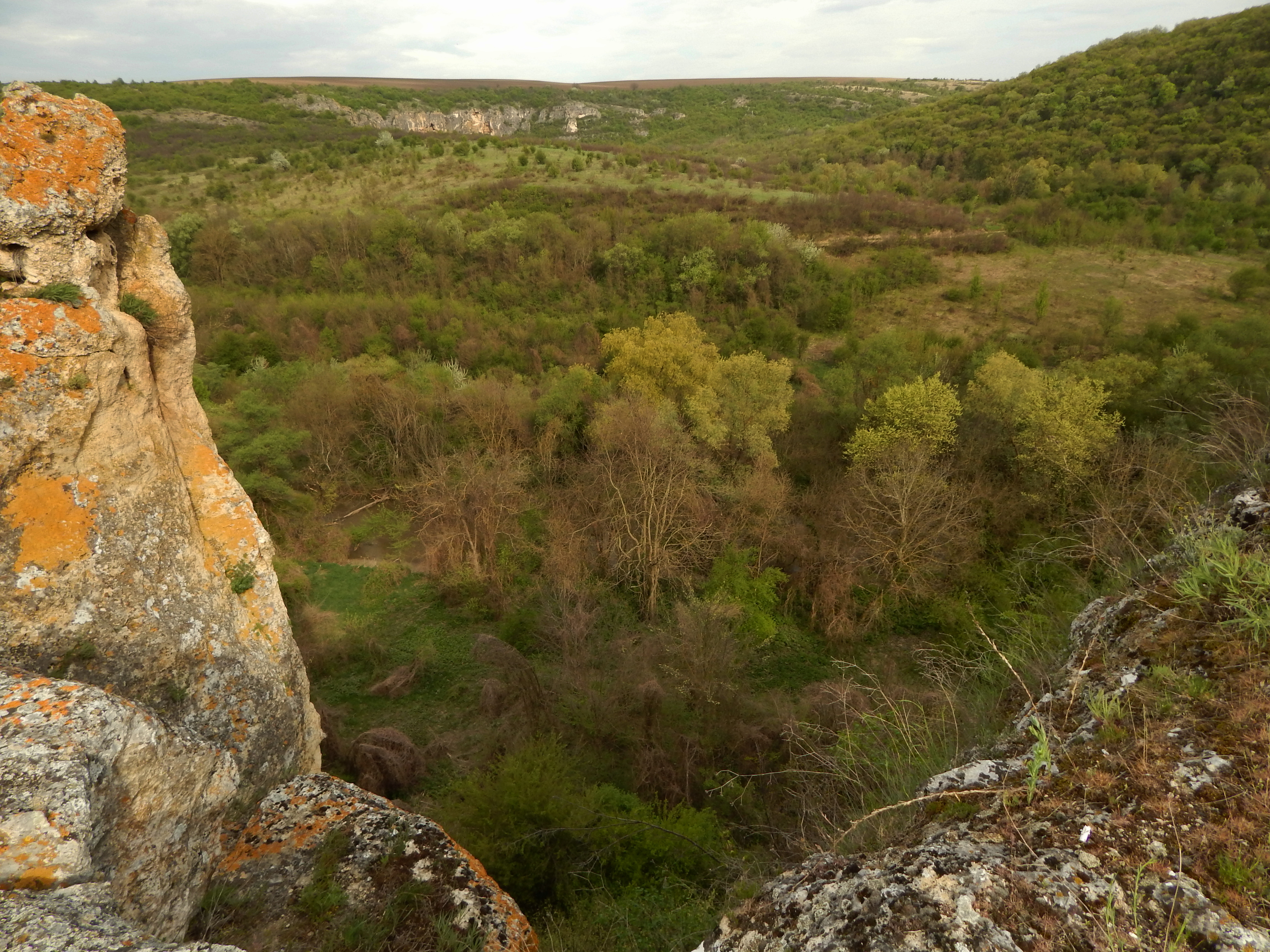
A view of the Canyon of Rusenski Lom

The cave was discovered in 1941 by the shepherd Stoyan Spasov. Orlova Chuka was opened to tourists in 1952. In 1963 the cave and the adjoining area of 7,5 ha. were declared a natural landmark, and in 1978 it was declared an archaeological monument of national importance.

The cave was intermittently inhabited by humans 200 000 - 40 000 years ago due to the relatively high constant temperature. It the cave were discovered spearheads, flint tools, and axe and pieces of pottery dating from the Chalcolithic. It used to be inhabited by cave bears.

== Fauna ==
Orlova Chuka is home to 14 species of bats that inhabit the cave in different seasons in a colony of about 12,000 individuals. Of these species three are included in the IUCN Red List: the long-fingered bat, the Mediterranean horseshoe bat and the Mehely's horseshoe bat. Orlova Chuka is the most important winter refuge of the Mediterranean horseshoe bat and the Mehely's horseshoe bat in Bulgaria. The presence of the following species was determined by observation and by catching bats with nets:

- greater horseshoe bat (Rhinolophus ferrumequinum)
- lesser horseshoe bat (Rhinolophus hipposideros)
- Mediterranean horseshoe bat (Rhinolophus еuryale)
- Mehely's horseshoe bat (Rhinolophus mehelyi)
- Geoffroy's bat (Myotis emarginatus)
- greater mouse-eared bat (Myotis myotis)
- lesser mouse-eared bat (Myotis blythii)
- common bent-wing bat (Miniopterus schreibersi)
- long-fingered bat (Myotis capaccinii)
- Daubenton's bat (Myotis daubentonii)
- serotine bat (Eptesicus serotinus)
- Savi's pipistrelle (Hypsugo savii)
- common noctule (Nyctalus noctula)
- common pipistrelle (Pipistrellus pipistrellus)

== See also ==
- Geography of Bulgaria
- List of caves in Bulgaria
- List of protected areas of Bulgaria
- List of rock formations in Bulgaria
