= Ledenika =

Cave in the Balkan Mountains

Coordinates: 43°12′16″N 23°29′28″E

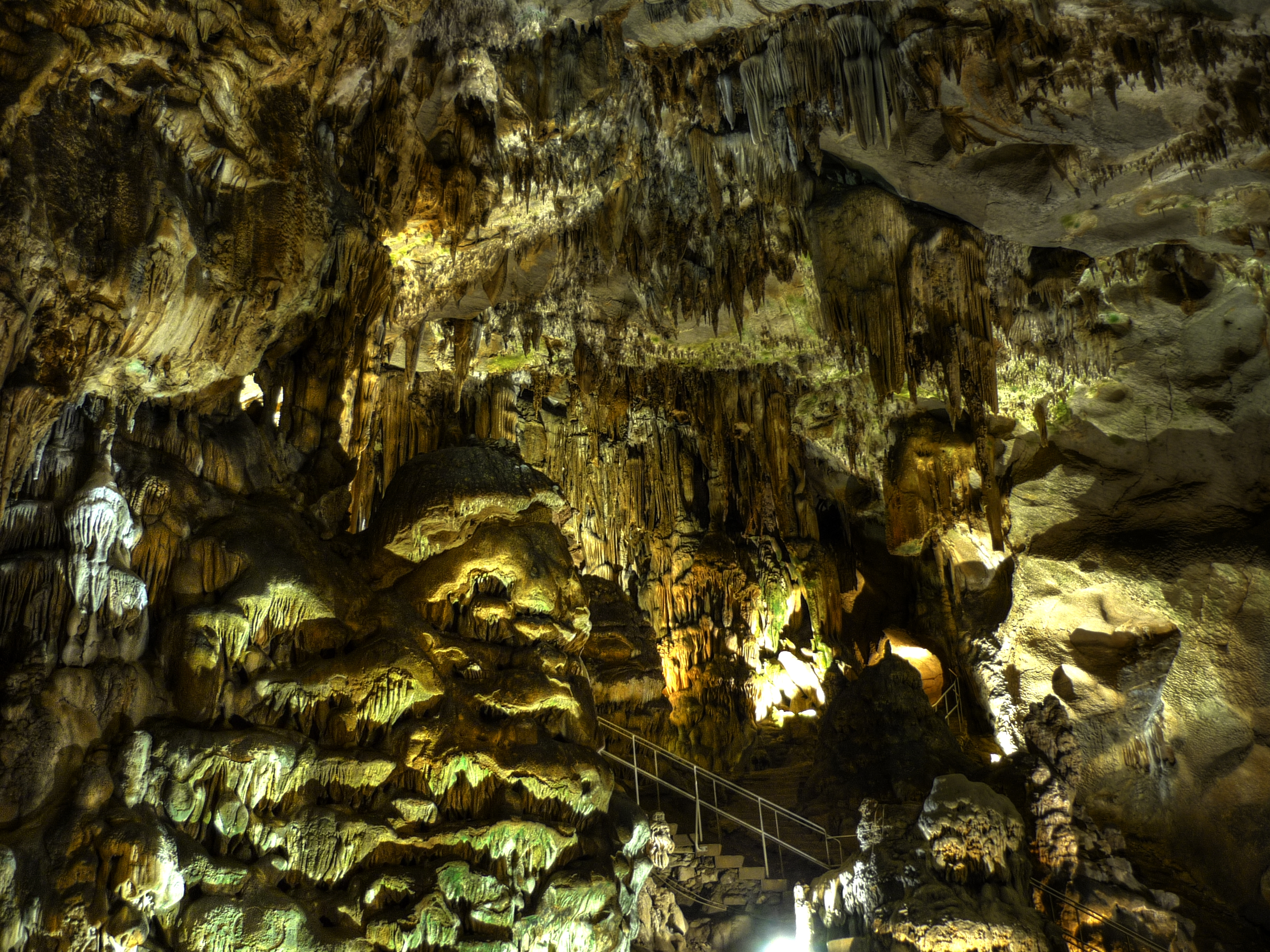
The Concert Hall

Ledenika (Bulgarian: Леденика, English: icy or glacial) is a cave in the Northwestern parts of the Balkan Mountains, 16 km away from the Bulgarian city of Vratsa. Its entrance is approximately 830 m above sea level. The cave features an abundance of galleries and impressive karst formations including stalactites and stalagmites. It was first discovered around the beginning of the 20th century and has been open to tourists since 1961. Ledenika Peak on Graham Land in Antarctica is named after the cave, in recognition of its cultural importance.

== Description ==
The cave is about 300 m long and contains ten separate halls. Visitors enter through the Antechamber, then pass through several smaller passages into the Concert Hall. Visitors then pass through several more smaller passages, eventually emerging in the White Hall.

The largest gallery is known as the Great Temple, with a ceiling of 15 m (50 ft). The Concert Hall is smaller, but has an enormous variation of stalactites and stalagmites. During the winter, icicles may form on the ceiling. The abundance of icicles in winter is thought to have led to the cave's name, which in English translates to icy or glacial.

== Geology ==
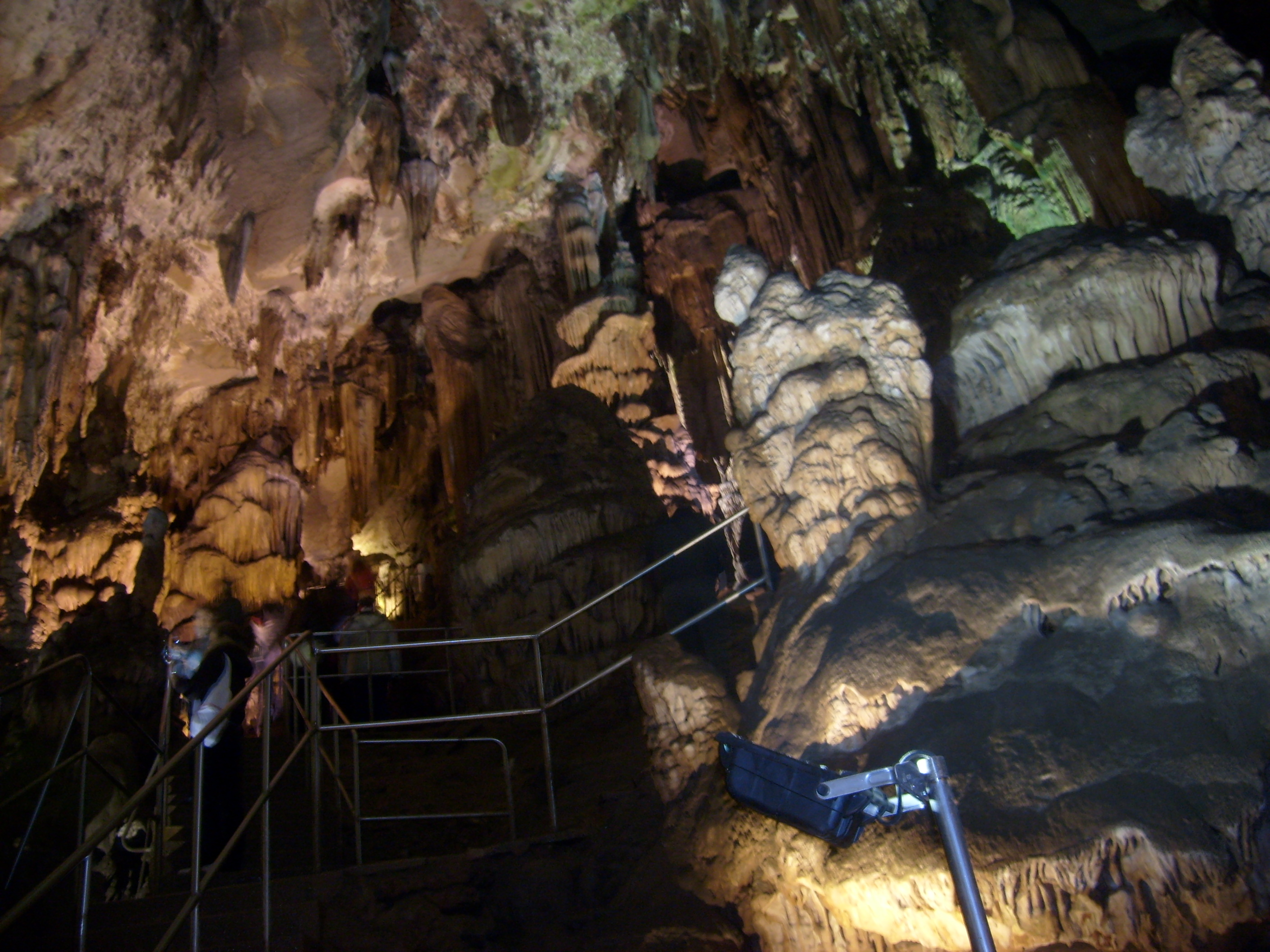
Tourist walkways through Ledenika

The limestone formations in the cave have been dated back to the Pliocene era.

== Tourism ==
The Bulgarian Tourist Union has included Ledenika in their 100 Tourist Sites of Bulgaria, a promotional effort aimed at highlighting the nation's best tourist spots. The cave has been one of the country's most noted caves since it was opened to tourists. In the late 1980s, there were a record 100,000 visitors annually.

== Gallery ==
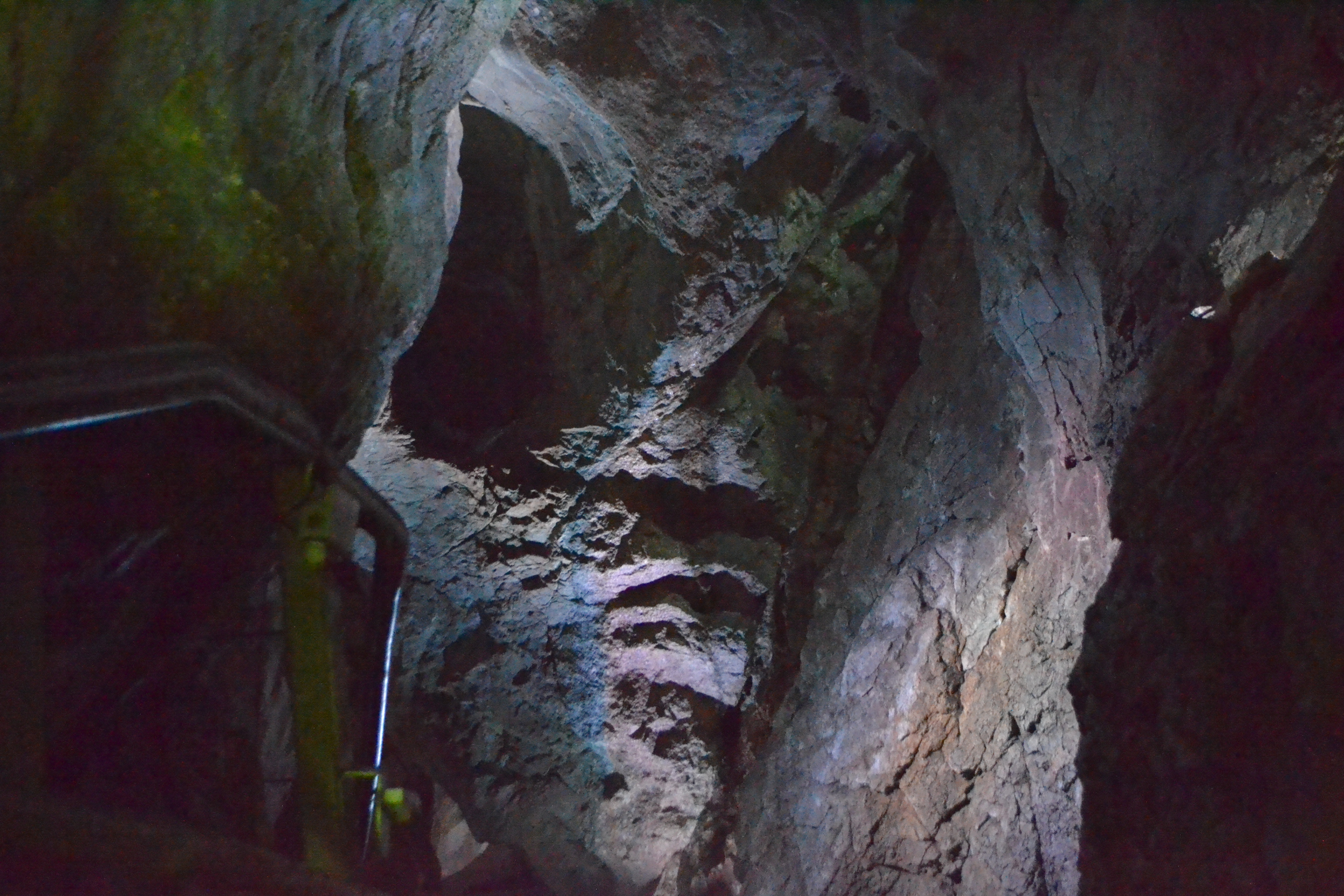

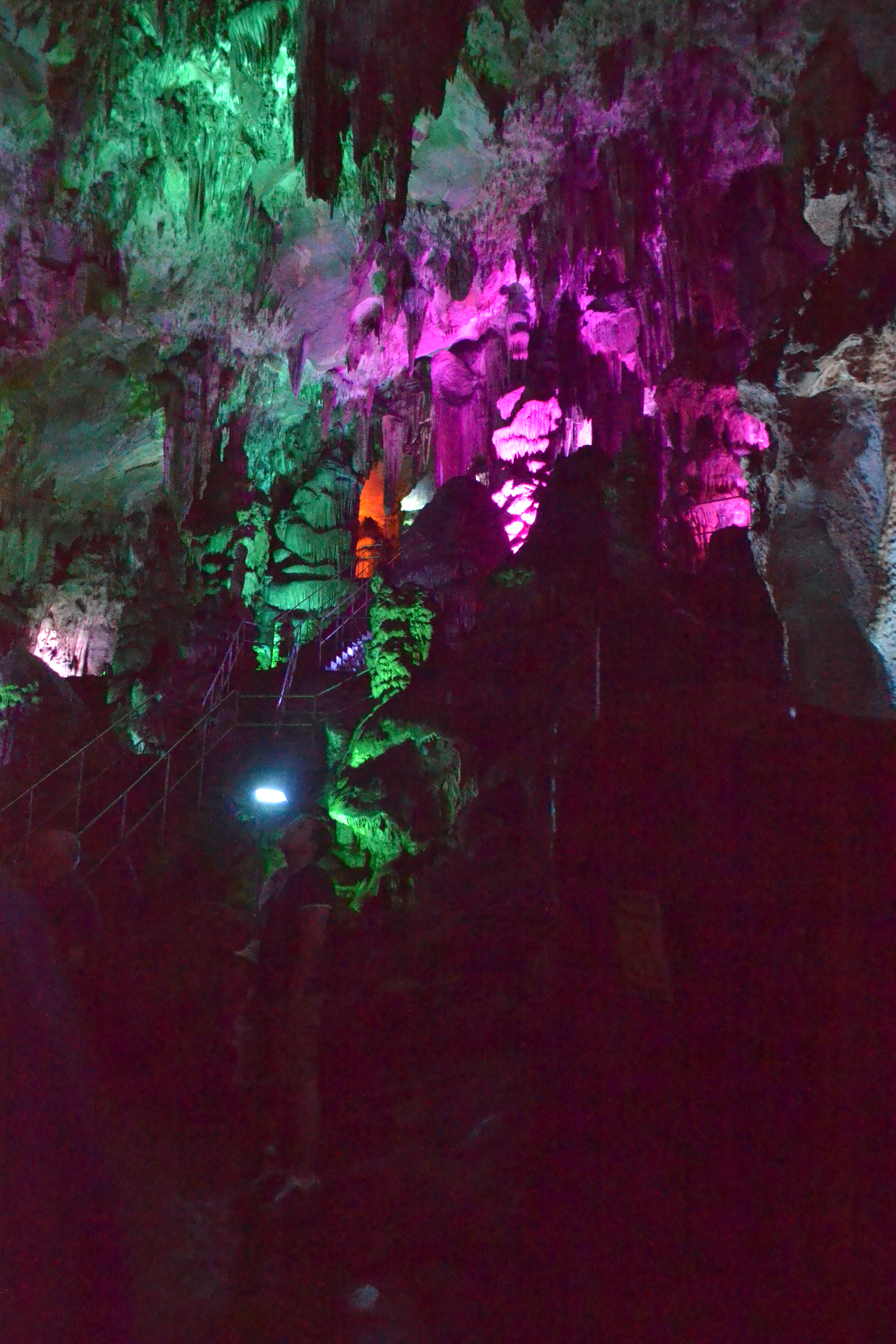

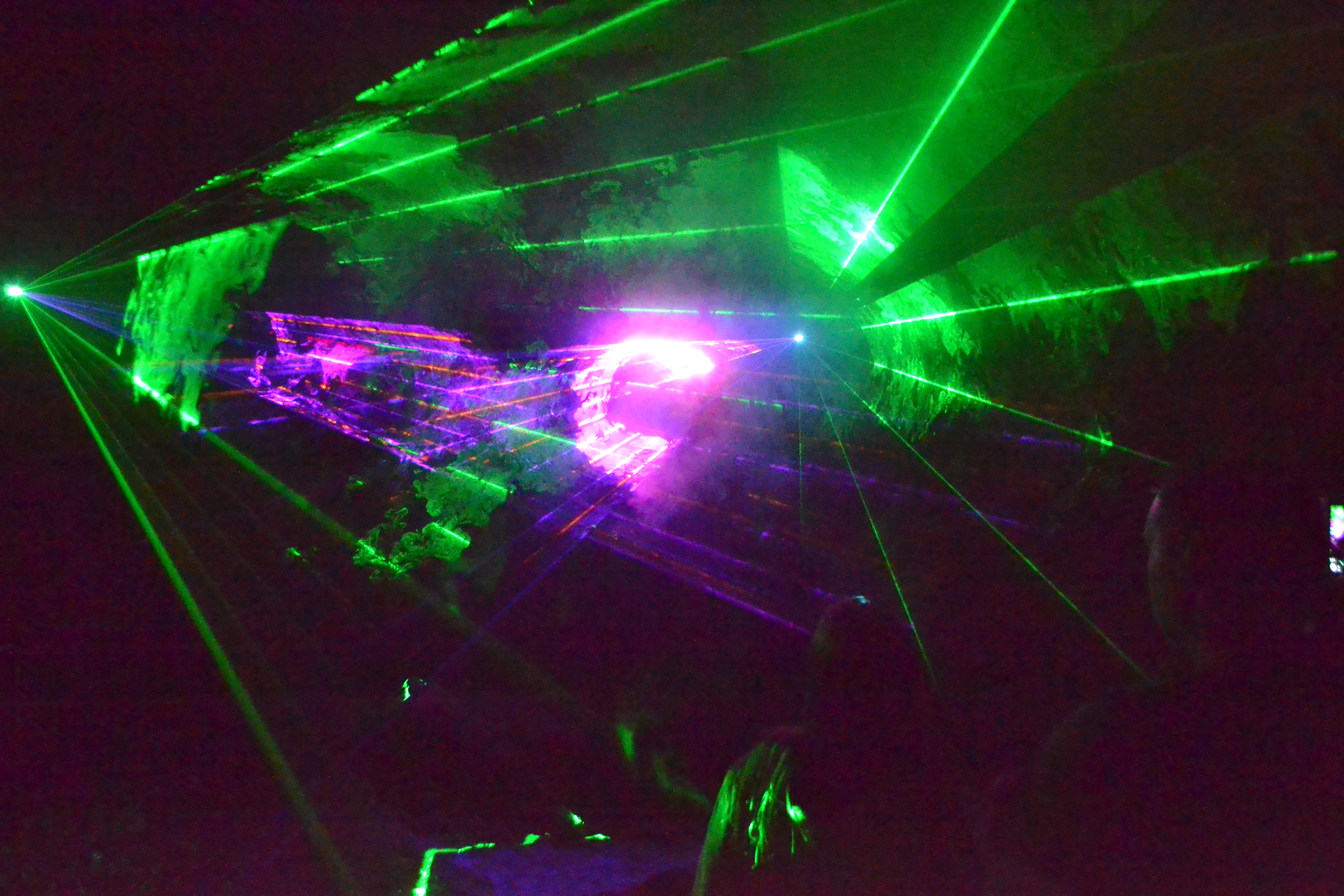

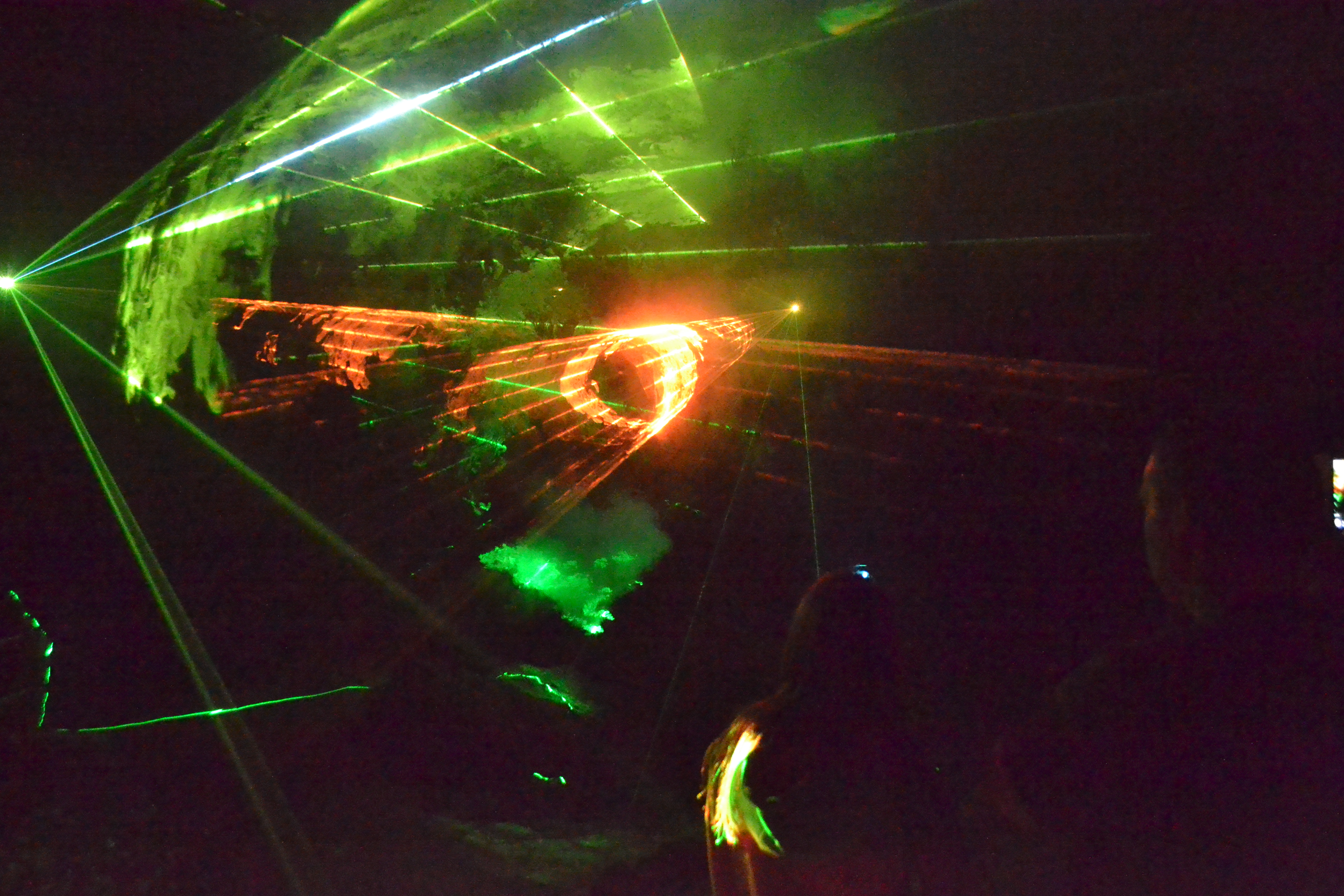

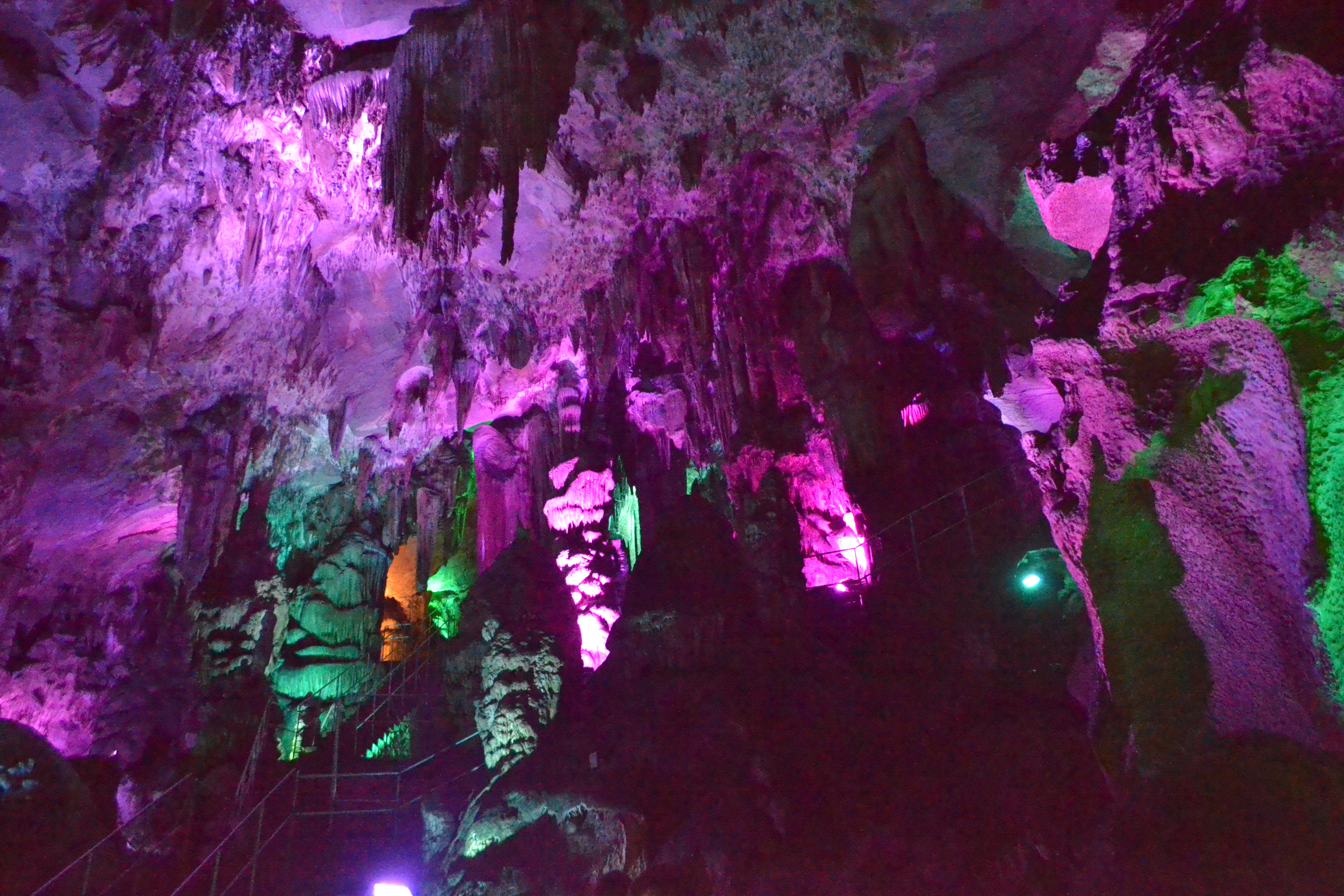

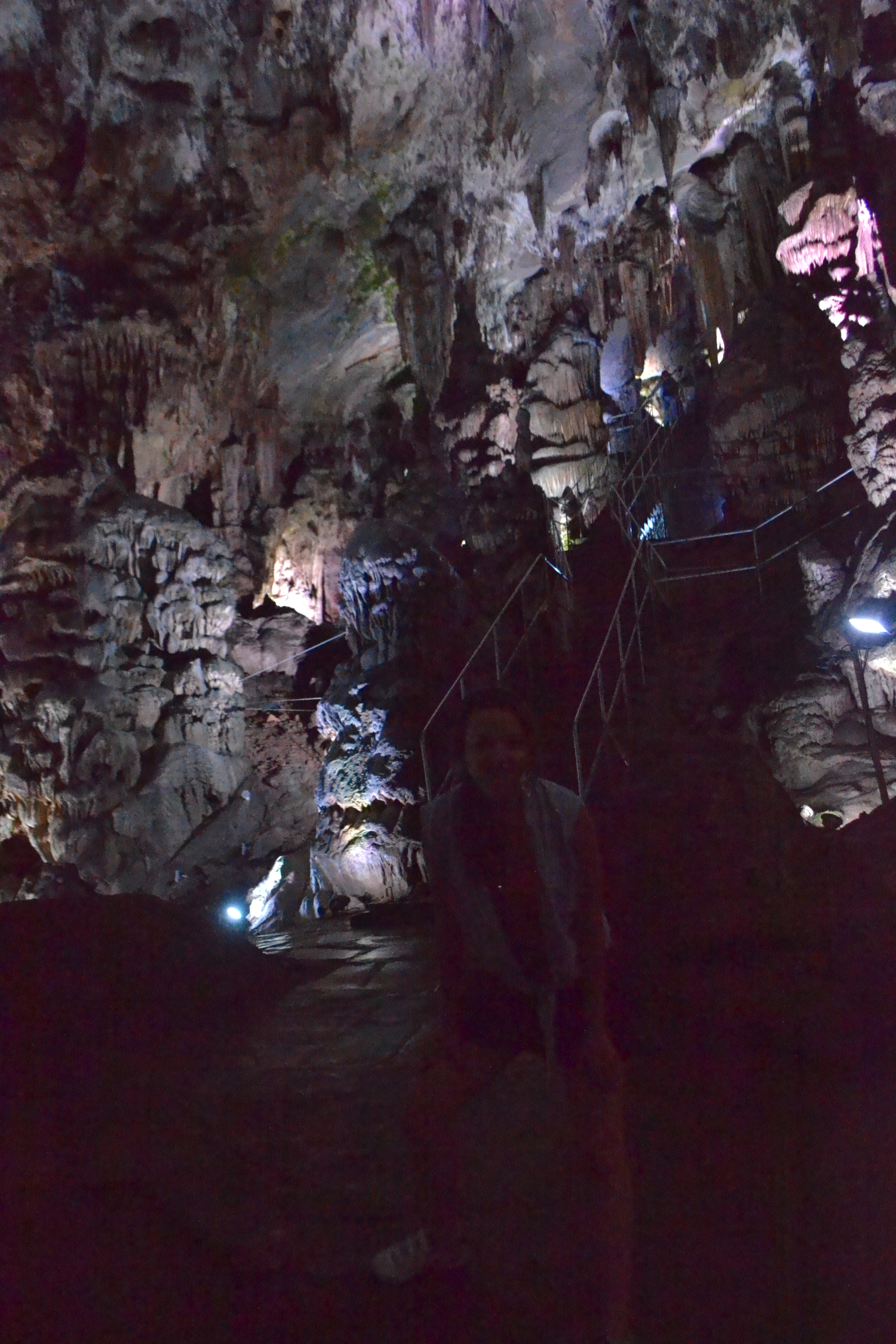

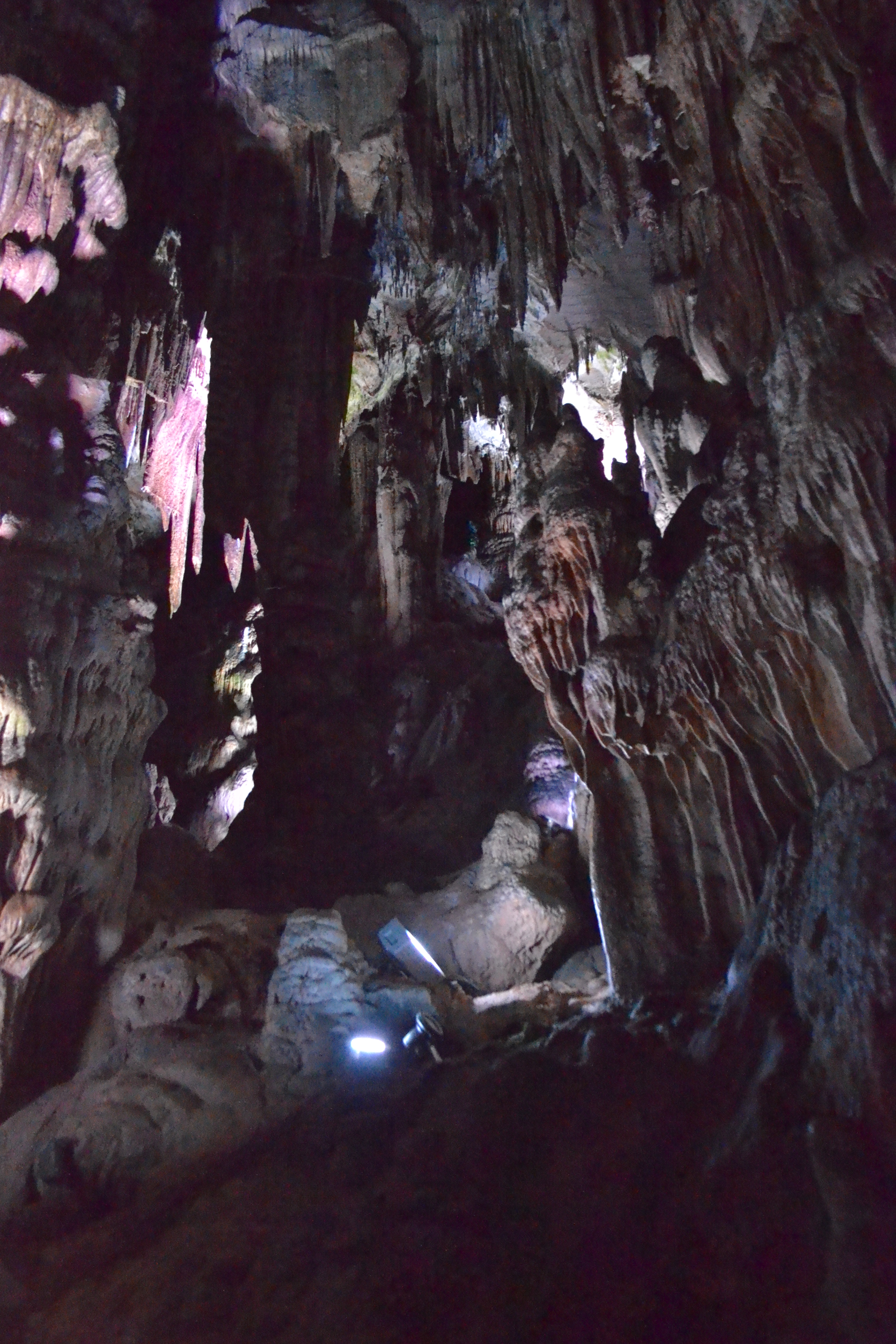

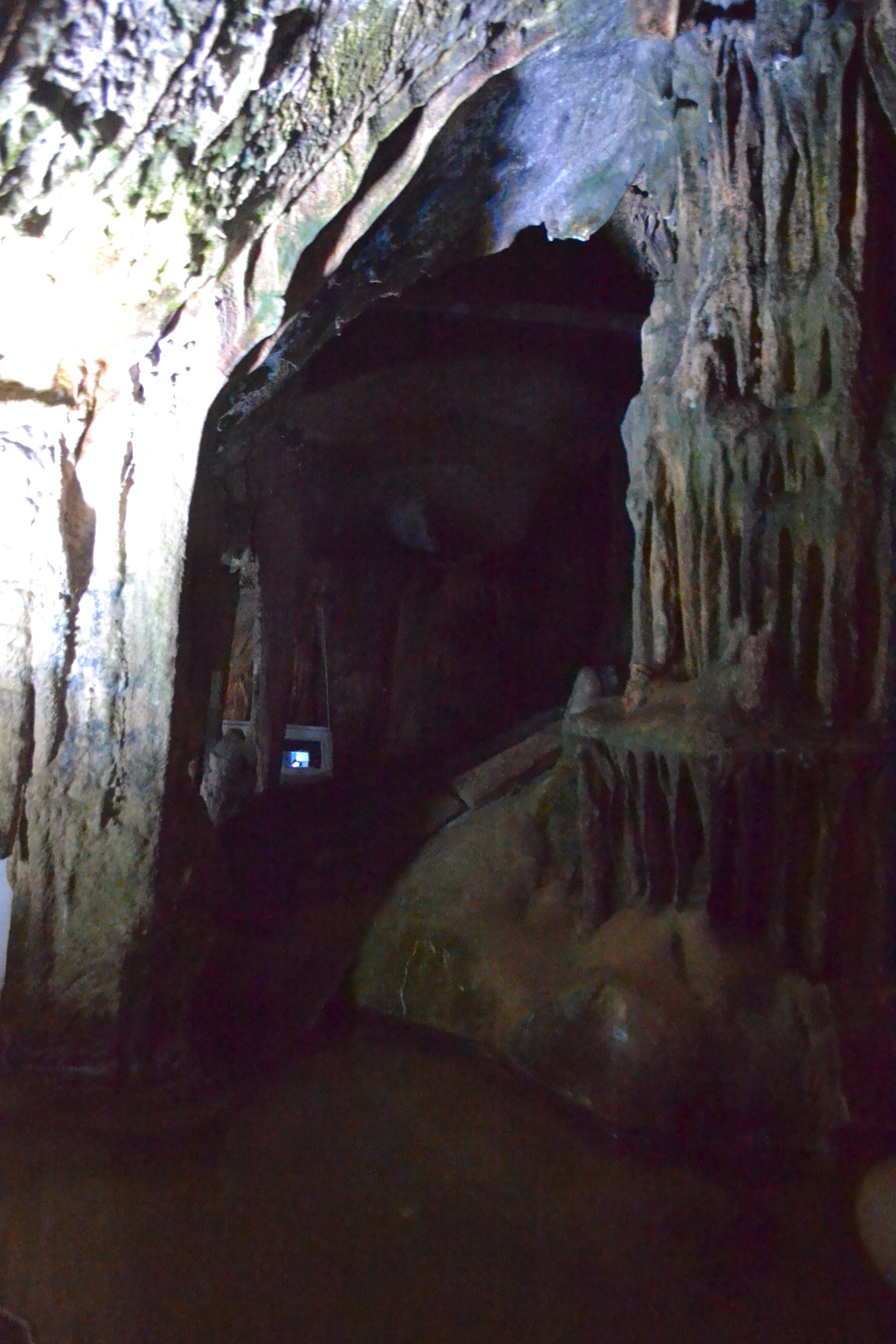

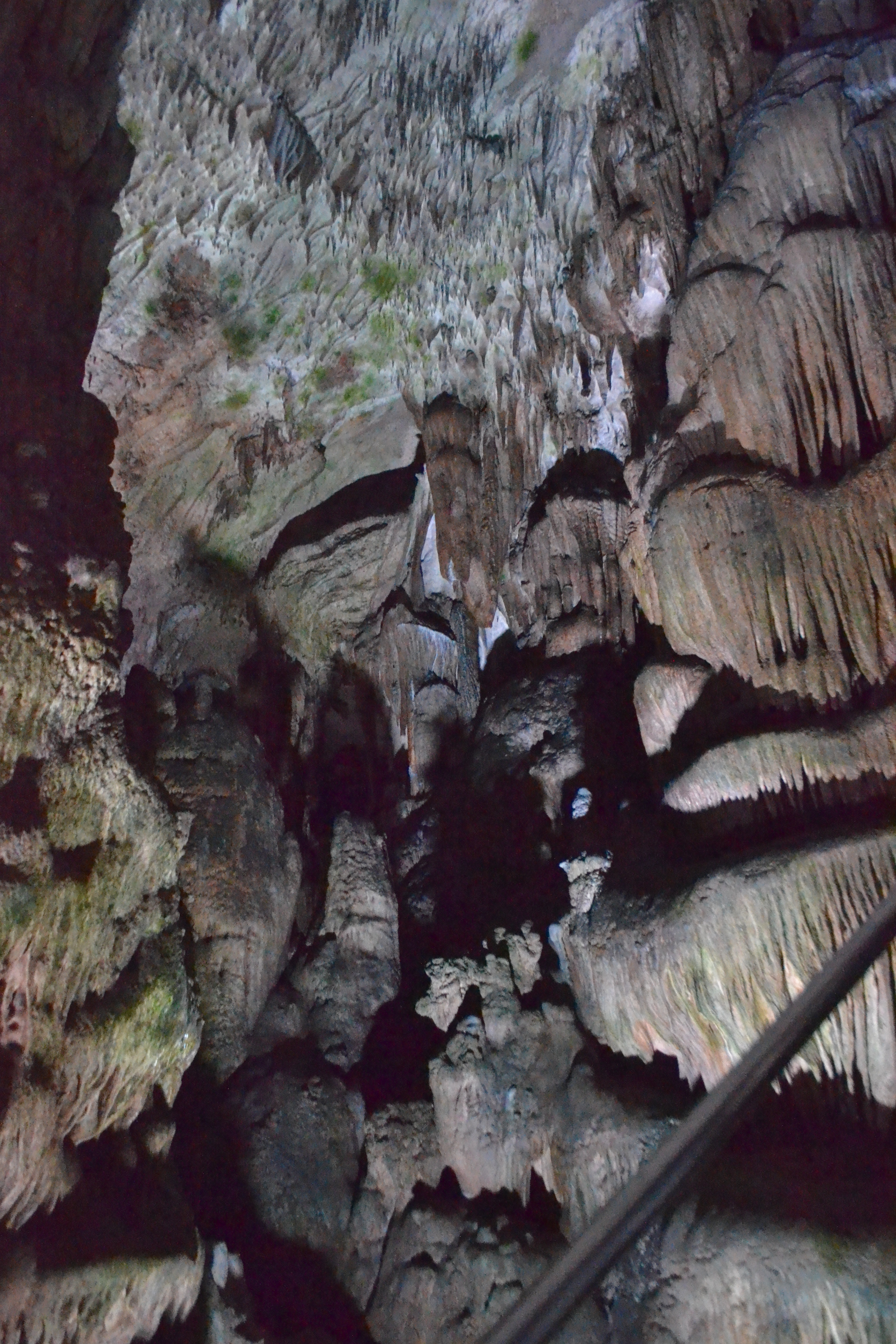

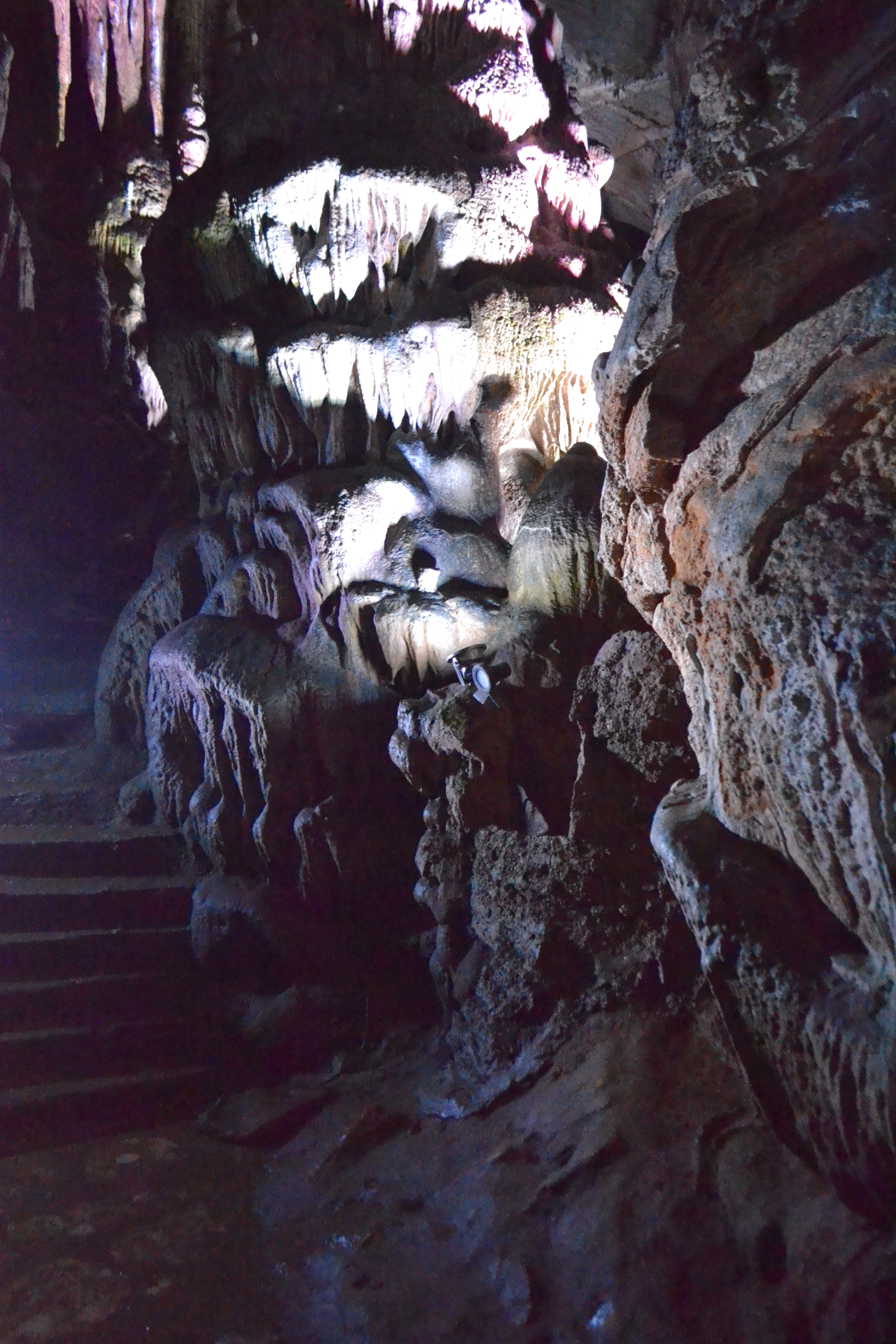

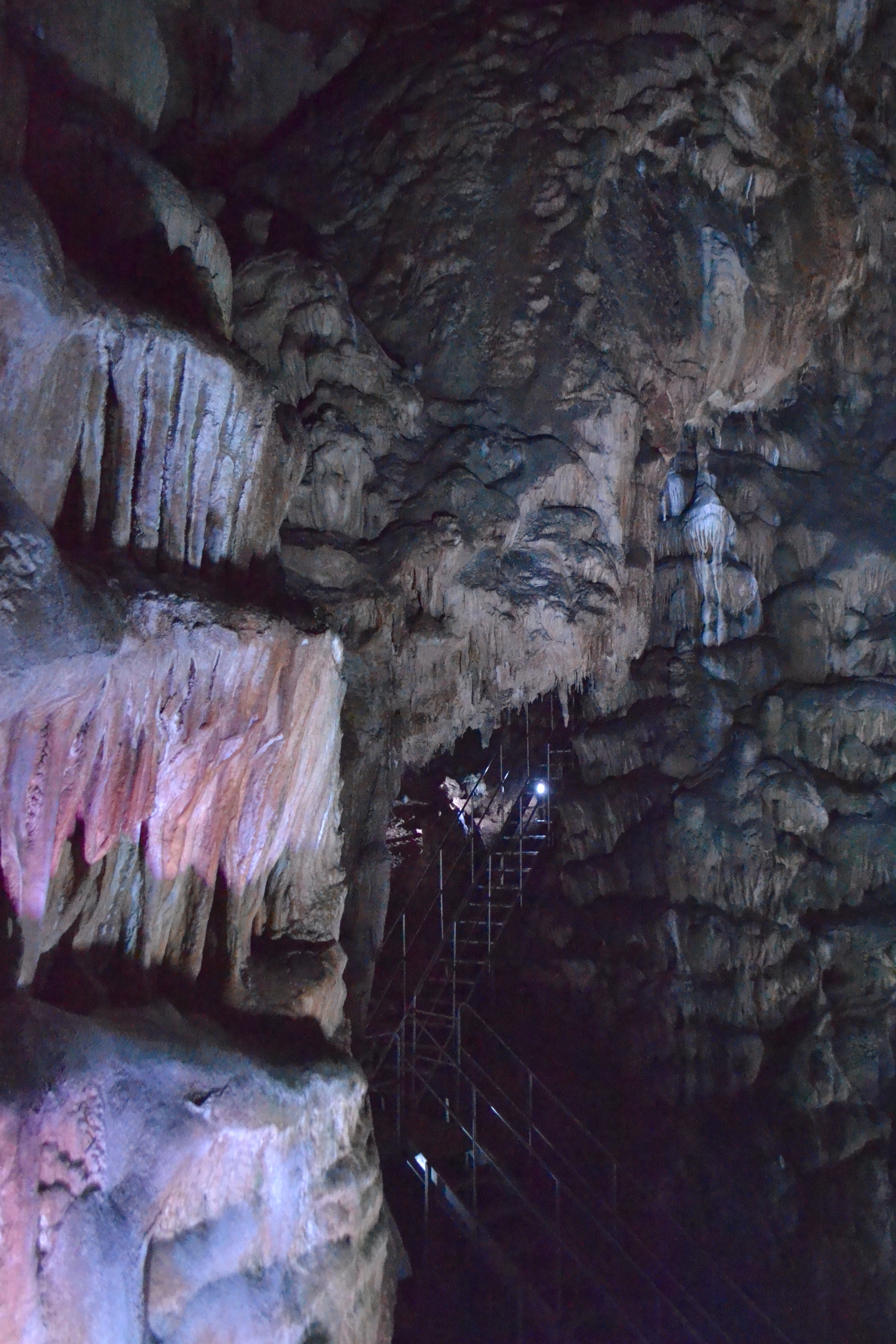

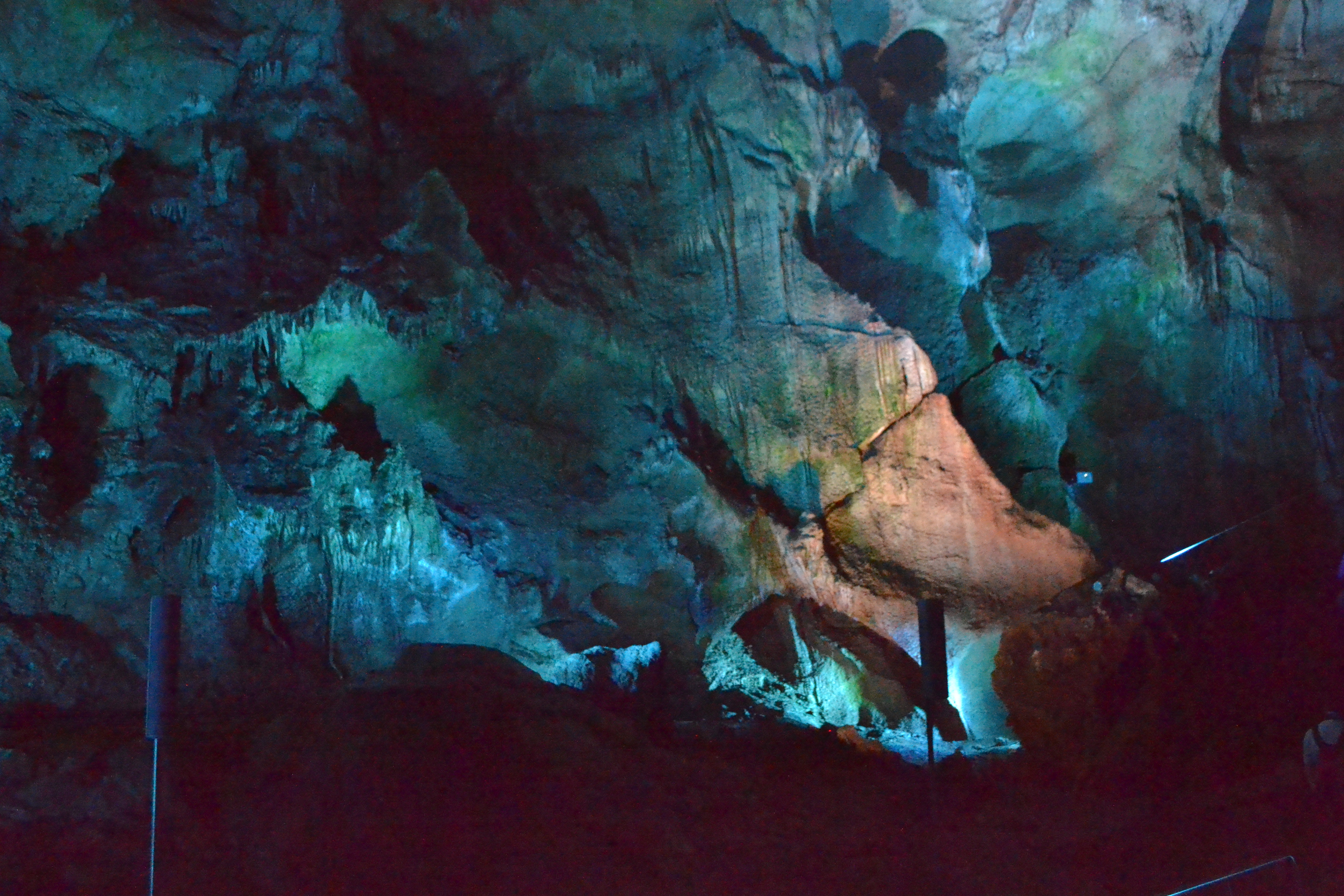

== See also ==
- List of caves in Bulgaria
