= Duhlata =

Duhlata Cave
- Пещера Духлата
- Location within Bulgaria
- Location: Bosnek, Pernik Province
- Coordinates: 42°29′45″N 23°11′45″E
- Length: 18,200 m (59,700 ft)
- Height variation: 53 m (174 ft)
- Access: restricted

Duhlata (Bulgarian: Духлата) is a cave situated in Vitosha mountain, western Bulgaria. With a total length of 18,200 m, Duhlata is the second longest (since 2022) cave in the country. It was declared a natural monument in 1962. The cave is home to six species of bats.

== Location ==
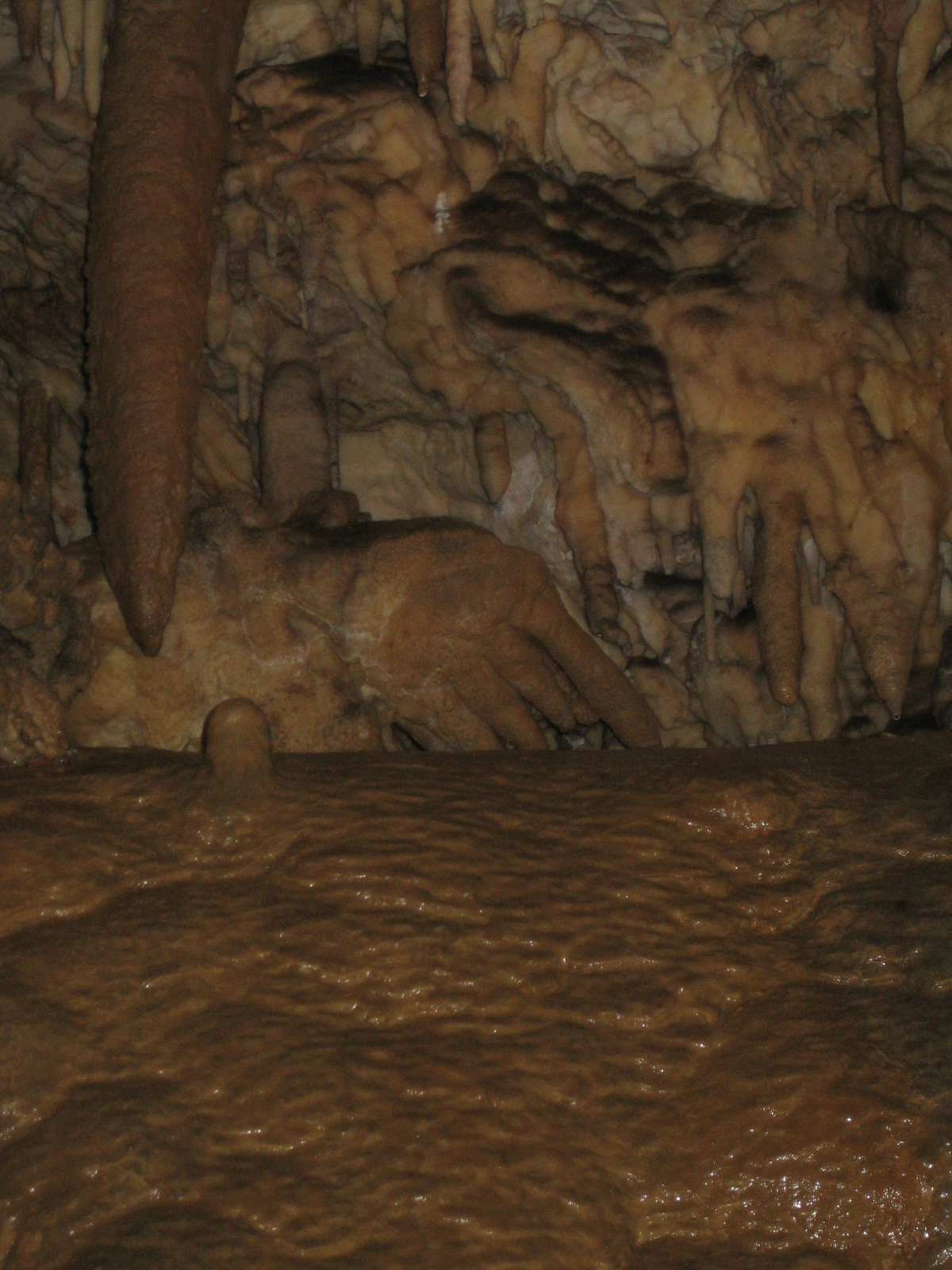
A view of the cave

Duhlata is situated in the south-western area of Vitosha on the left bank of the river Struma near the village of Bosnek, Pernik Province. The entrance of the cave is located at the very road between Bosnek and Chuypetlovo.

== Description ==
The name of the cave originated from the sounds of the wind through its entrance, from Bulgarian духам (transl. duham), meaning to whistle. Duhlata is 18,200 m long and 53 m deep. The cave is well studied and mapped and boasts great diversity of speleothems. Duhlata is one of the most complex cave systems in Bulgaria and was created by underground currents of the Struma River. It is a maze of tunnels, galleries, underground lakes, waterfalls and sinter formations situated at seven levels. There are six subterranean rivers. The first map of the cave was created by Vasko Georgiev, a rock climber in 1960s.

It is home to 22 species of known animal species, including six bat species. The stygofauna include 11 Copepods, 2 Amphipoda, 1 Syncarida and 1 Acari species, and the only species of the troglofauna is the pseudoscorpion Neobisium kwartirnikovi. The diversity of worms (Nematoda, Oligochaeta), snails (Mollusca) and seed shrimps (Ostracoda) has not been studied.

Access to the cave is restricted. Duhlata can be visited only by researchers or experienced cavers with permission by Vitosha Nature Park Directorate.

== See also ==
- Geography of Bulgaria
- List of caves in Bulgaria
- List of protected areas of Bulgaria
- List of rock formations in Bulgaria
