= Dragalevska =

Location
- Country: Bulgaria

Physical characteristics
- Mouth
  - location: Slatinska
  - coordinates: 42.6704°N 23.3696°E

Basin features
- Progression: Slatinska→ Perlovska→ Iskar→ Danube→ Black Sea

The Dragalevska (Bulgarian: Драгалевска река, Dragalevska reka) is a river in western Bulgaria, a tertiary tributary of the Iskar.

The river flows through peat bogs from the lower northern part of Torfeno Branishte Nature Reserve on Vitosha Mountain, and passes by Kominite area. At the northern foothills of Vitosha the river crosses the village of Dragalevtsi (now part of Sofia, from which the river takes its name), then join few other minor rivers to form Slatinska, and flow into the Perlovska which in turn flows into the Iskar river in the northeastern outskirts of Sofia.
