= Dve Mogili =

Dve Mogili Две могили
- Location of Dve Mogili
- Coordinates: 43°36′N 25°52′E
- Country: Bulgaria
- Provinces (Oblast): Rousse

Government
  - Mayor: Bozhidar Borisov
- Elevation: 242 m (794 ft)

Population (31.12.2009)
  - Total: 4,342
- Time zone: UTC+2 (EET)
  - Summer (DST): UTC+3 (EEST)
- Postal Code: 7150
- Area code: 08141

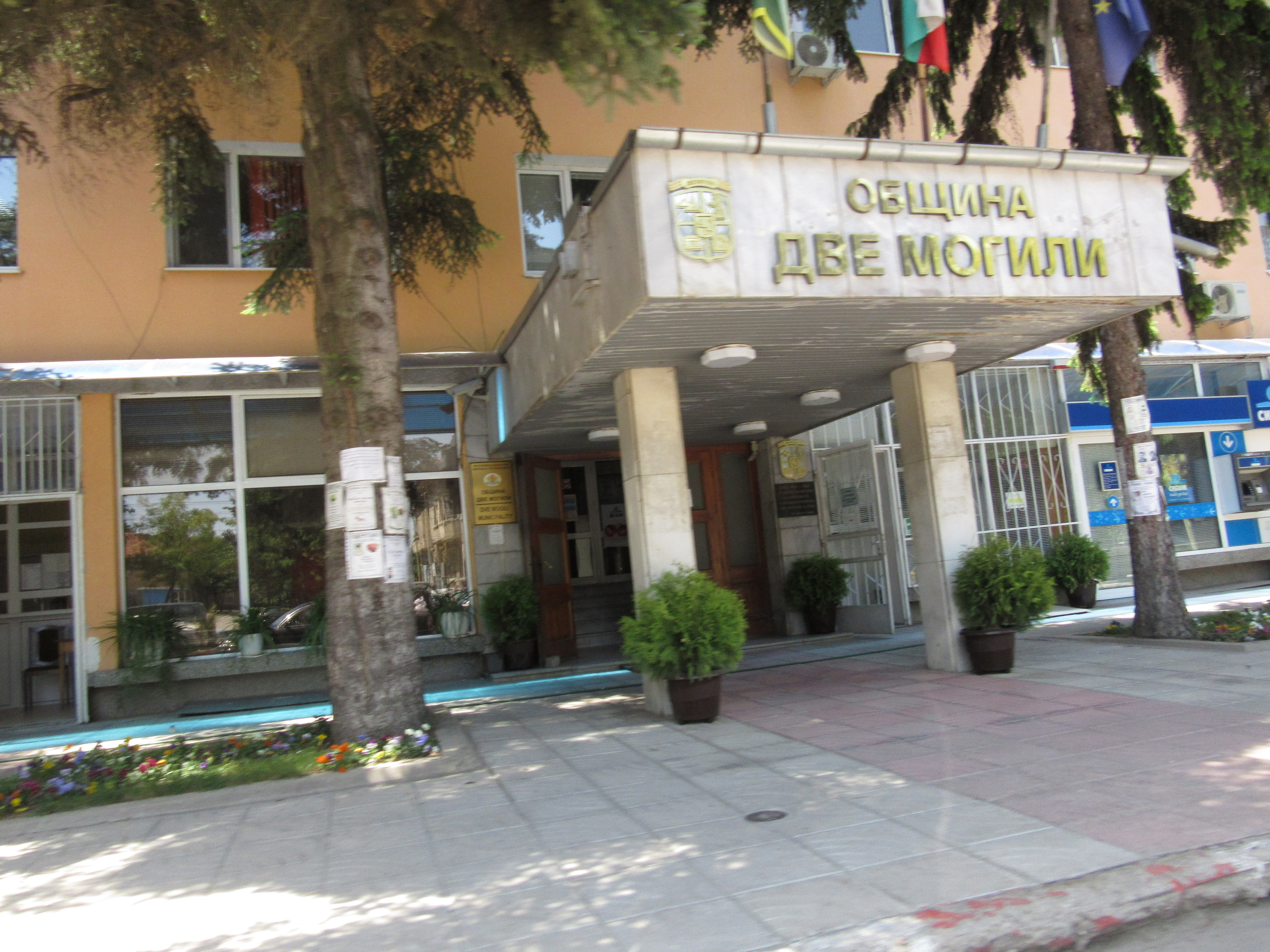
Dve mogili Townhall

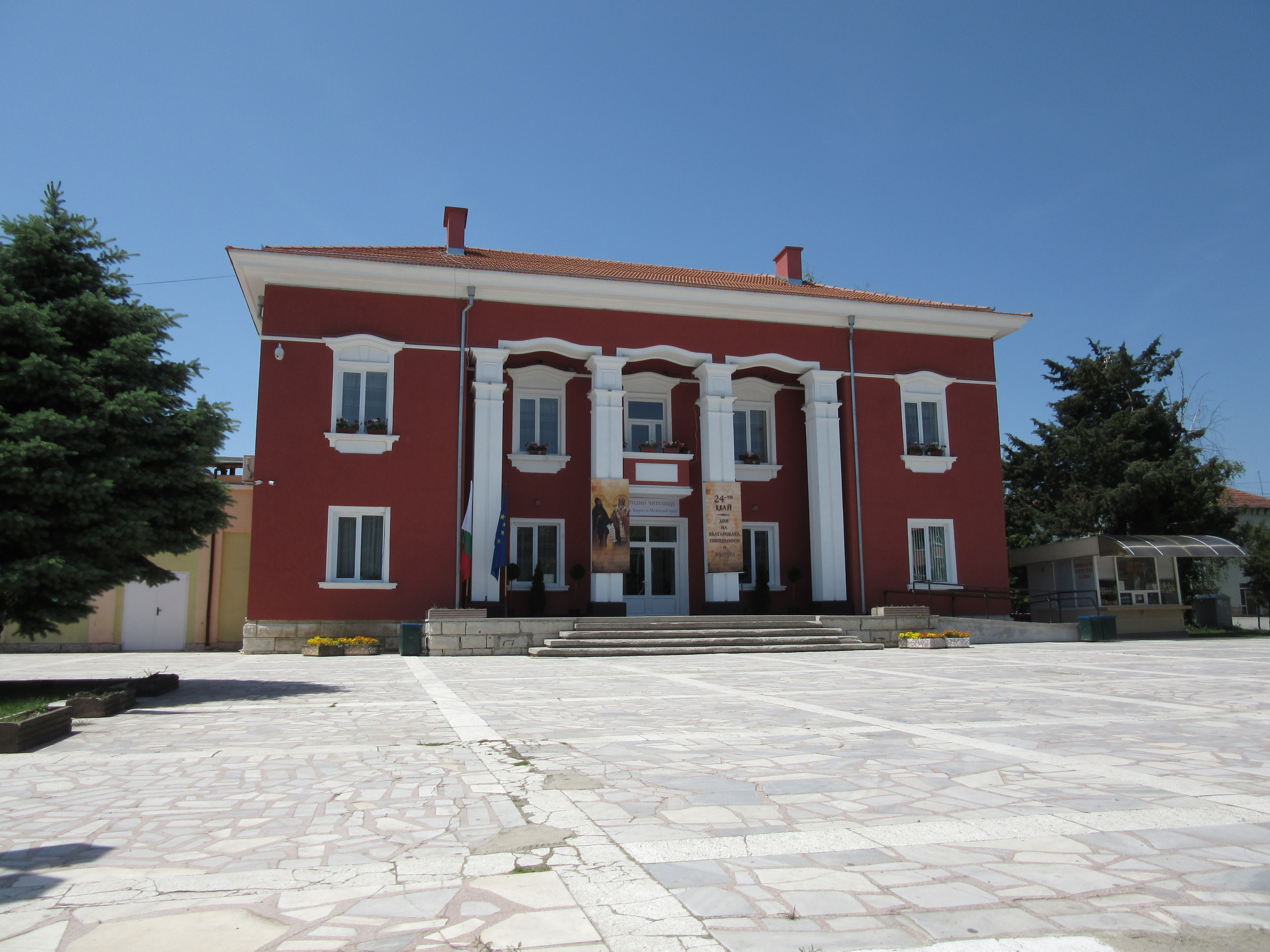
Chitalishte (Culture club) Dve Mogili

Dve Mogili (Bulgarian: Две могили, pronounced [ˈdvɛ moˈɡili]) is a town in northeastern Bulgaria, part of Ruse Province. It is the administrative centre of Dve Mogili Municipality, which lies in the western part of the area. Dve Mogili is located 32 kilometres away from the provincial capital of Ruse. As of December 2009, the town had a population of 4,342.

The town's name means "two mounds" and is derived from the geographic features of the surrounding area, namely the mounds near the town. Dve Mogili was first mentioned in the early 15th century. In that period, it had a Bulgarian population. In 1656, the village was inhabited by Bulgarians and Turks. During the Russo-Turkish War of 1877-78, it had 100 houses and a population of 550.

Dve Mogili was the place where noted Bulgarian hajduk voivode Filip Totyu (1830–1907) spent the last years of his life after the Liberation of Bulgaria.

Bulgaria's second longest cave Orlova Chuka, with a total length of 13,437 m, is situated at 11 km to the east of the town.
