= Kominite =

Climbing area near Sofia, Bulgaria

Coordinates: 42°36′8″N 23°17′21″E

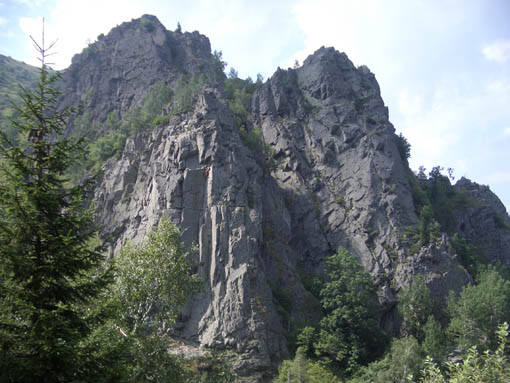

Kominite (Bulgarian: Комините [koˈminitɛ], meaning 'the chimneys') are several minor andesite peaks in the Vitosha Mountains near Sofia, Bulgaria. The peaks are in the upper valley of the Dragalevska River near the Bay Krastyo tourist site. The peaks are the nearest to and most easily accessible from a climbing area near Sofia, with climbing routes of UIAA grade II to VIII, and 50 to 100 m (160 to 330 ft) high. The Kominite peaks can be reached easily from Dragalevtsi via the Bay Krastyo or the Goli Vrah chair lift stations.

== See also ==
Komini Peak, a mountain in Antarctica named for Kominite
