= Bosnek =

Village in Pernik, Bulgaria

Bosnek Боснек
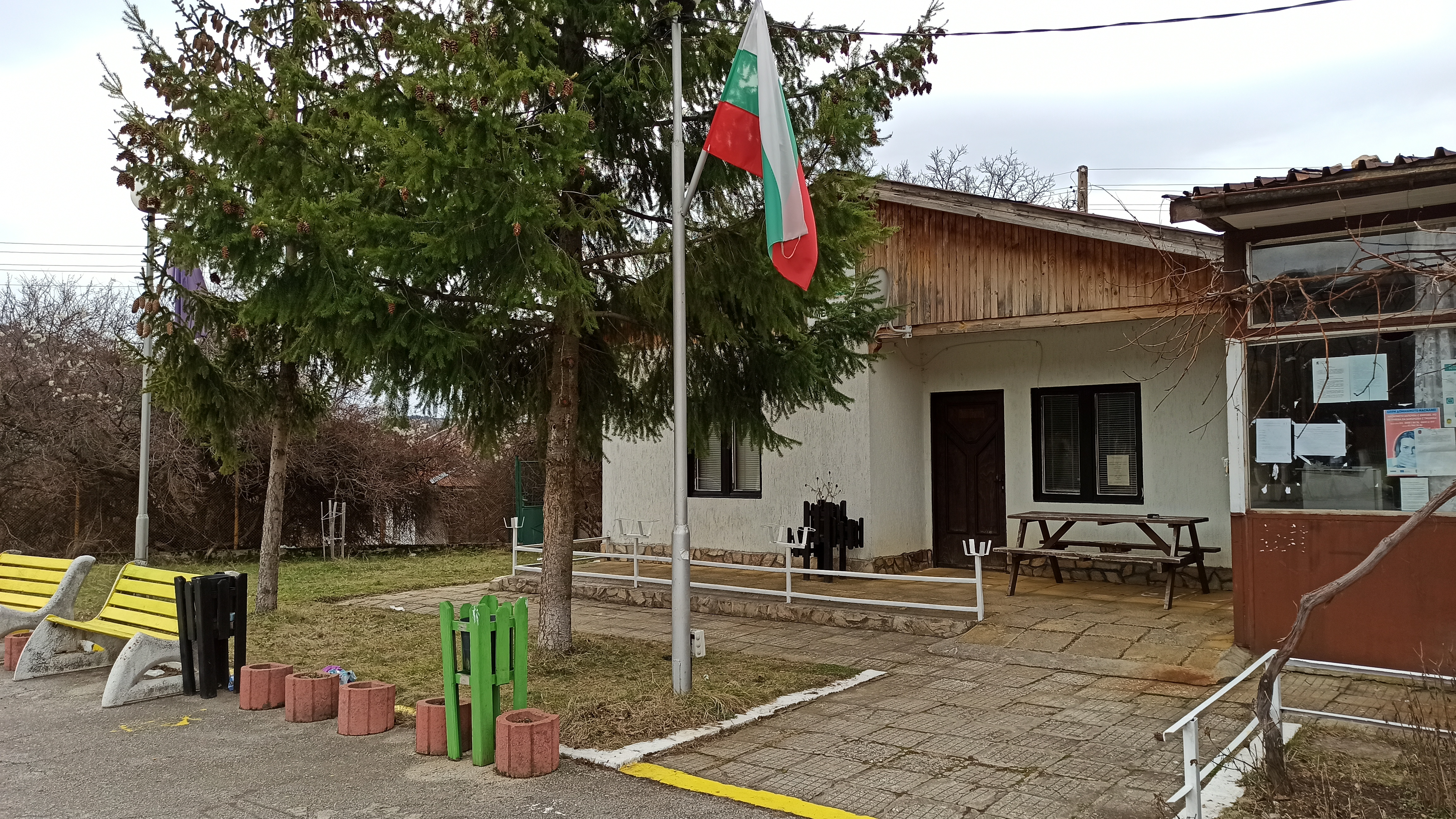
- Mayor's office of the village of Bosnek

- Location of Bosnek
- Coordinates: 42°29′42″N 23°10′50″E
- Country: Bulgaria
- Province: Pernik

Government
  - Mayor: Snezhanka Victorova
- Elevation: 940 m (3,080 ft)

Population (2020)
  - Total: 260
- Time zone: UTC+2 (EET)
  - Summer (DST): UTC+3 (EEST)
- Postal Code: 2345
- Website: bosnek.com

Bosnek (Bulgarian: Боснек [bosˈnɛk]) is a village in western Bulgaria, located in Pernik Municipality of Pernik Province.

It is known as the gateway for tourism into the karstic landscape of the Vitosha massif area. The village is downstream from a famous spring, called "living water", and is near the Duhlata cave, the longest in Bulgaria.

It has a population of 260 people (as of 2021).

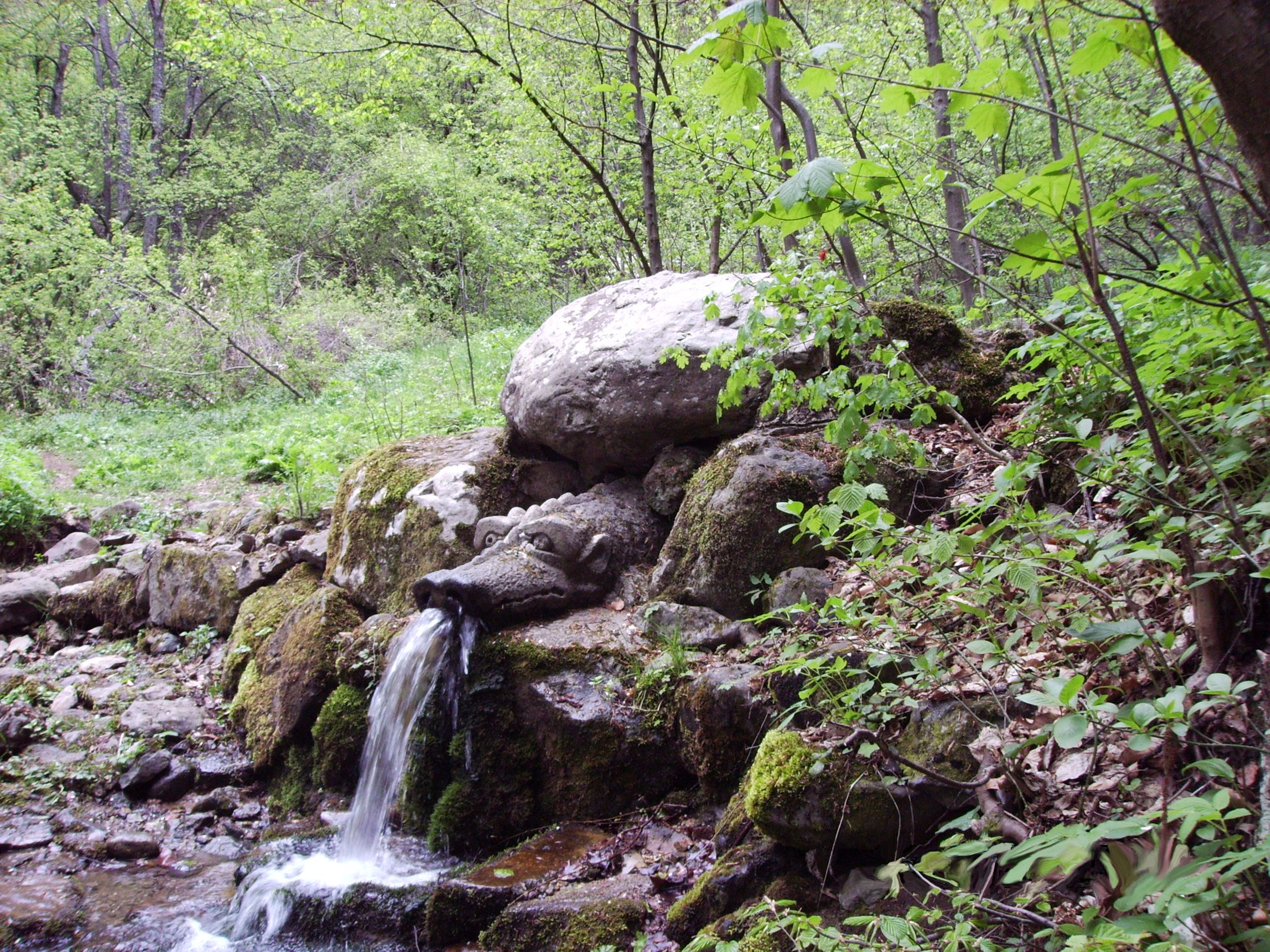
The "living water" spring
