= Milanovo, Sofia Province =

Milanovo Миланово
- Village
- Location within Bulgaria
- Coordinates: 43.1167°N 23.3942°E
- Country: Bulgaria
- Province: Sofia Province
- Municipality: Svoge

Government
  - Mayor: Veselin Petkov (BSP)
- Time zone: UTC+2 (EET)
  - Summer (DST): UTC+3 (EEST)

Milanovo is a village in Svoge Municipality, Sofia Province, western Bulgaria. It has a mayor office, a village square and a church. Milanovo is located above the village of Lakatnik (located in the Iskar River Valley) and on the main road to the town of Varshets.

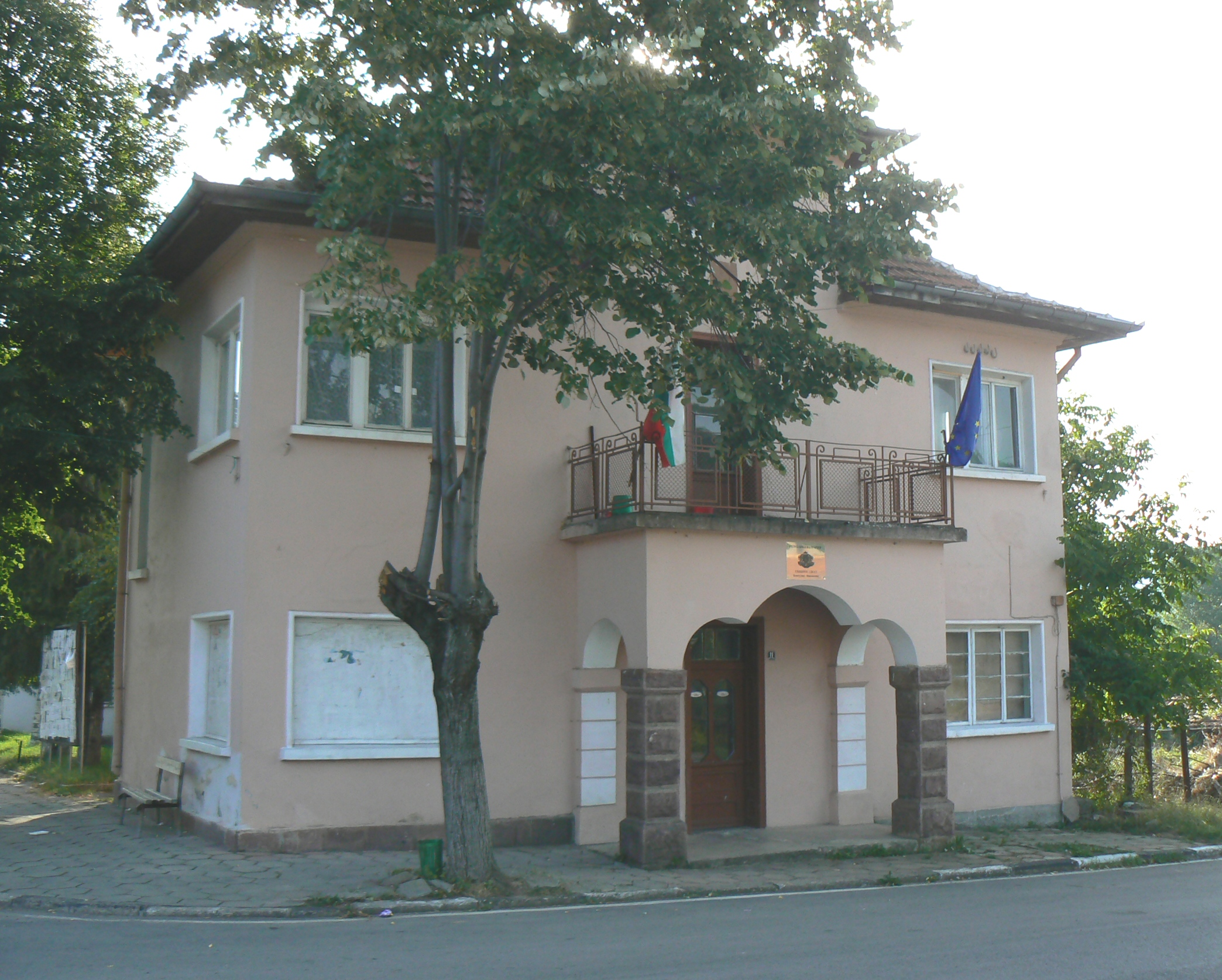
Mayor's office

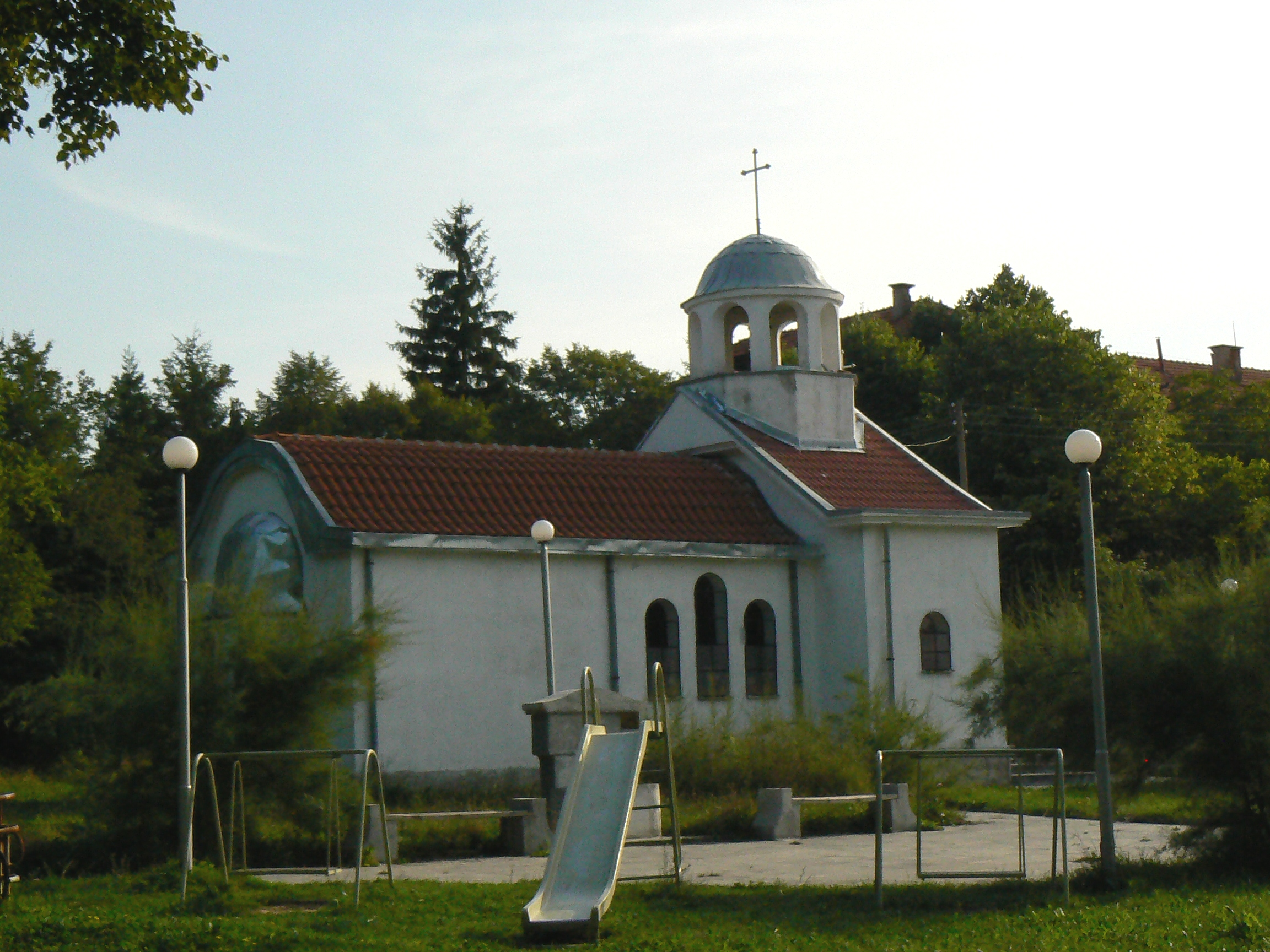
Village church

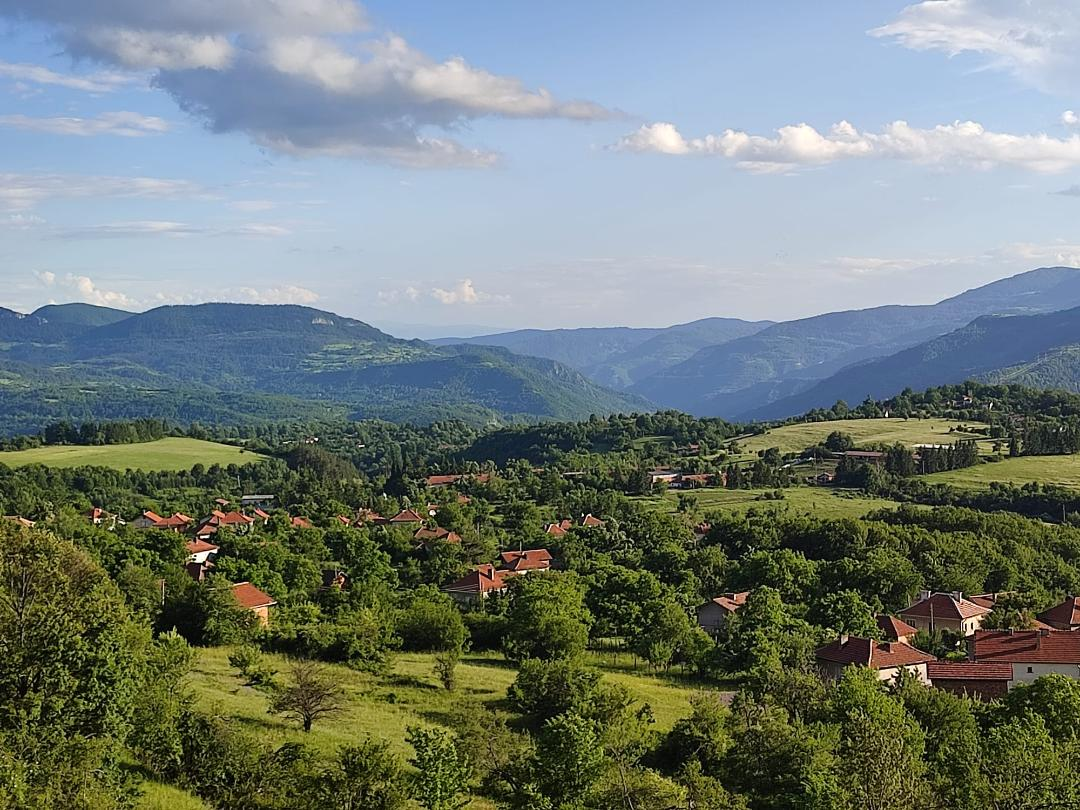

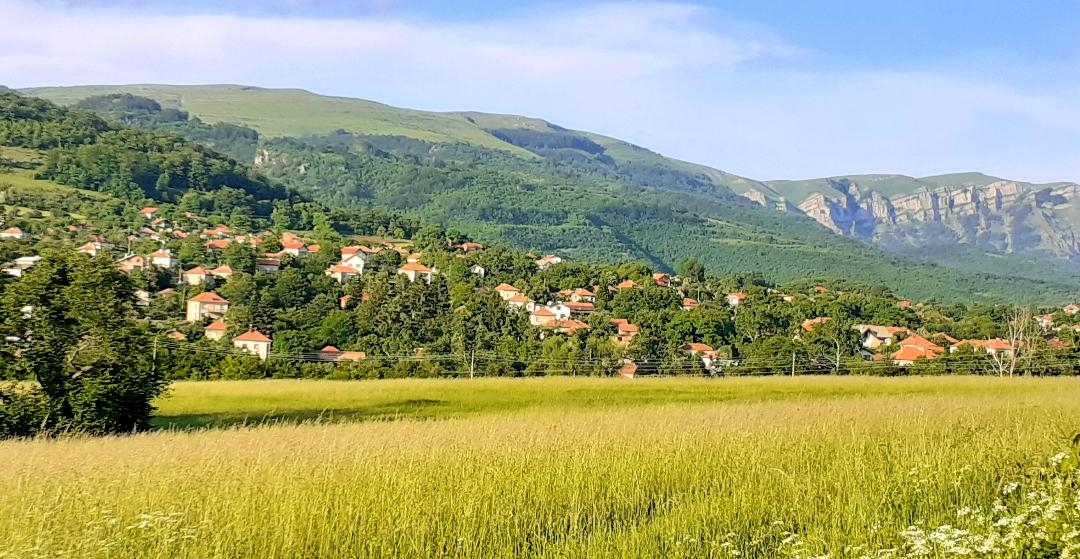
