= Buynovo Gorge =

Gorge in Bulgaria

- Буйновско ждрело
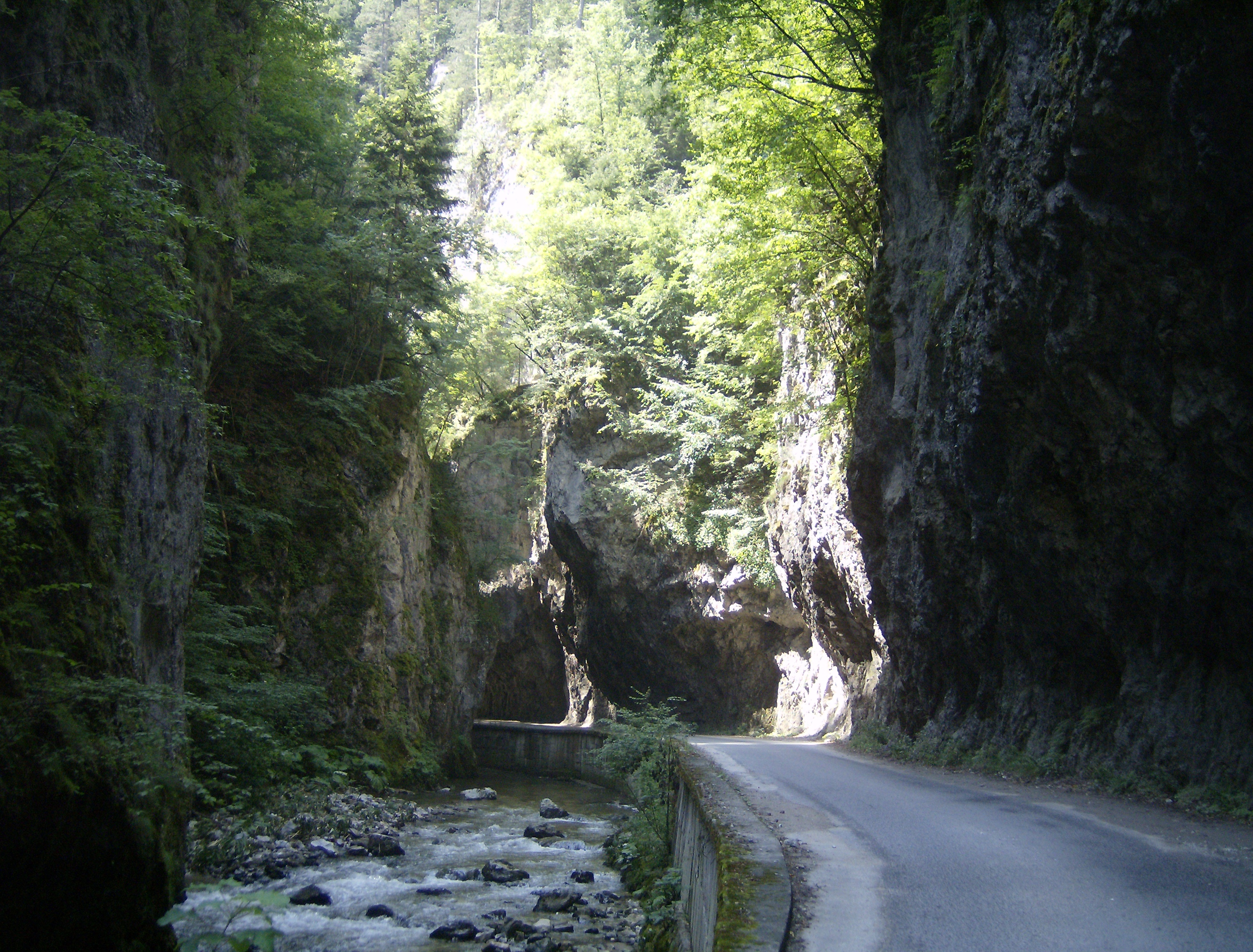
- View of Buynovsko Gorge

- Location within Bulgaria
- Floor elevation: 1,100 m (3,600 ft)

Geology
- Type: Gorge

Geography
- Location: From Road 197, halfway between Borino and Grohotno, turn south towards Yagodinska.
- Coordinates: 41°39′09″N 24°20′24″E
- Interactive map of Buynovo Gorge

Buynovo Gorge or Buynovsko Gorge (Bulgarian: Буйновско ждрело) is a limestone gorge in the western Rhodope Mountains located near Yagodina, between Borino and Grohotno. The gorge was cut near the Byunovska River. The most narrow spot of the gorge is called the Wolf's Jump after a local legend. The legend involves wolves leaping across the gorge to attack the sheep pens on the other side.

== Climate ==
Buynovsko Gorge is situated in the continental Mediterranean climate zone. The climate is influenced by Mediterranean cyclones mainly in late autumn and in winter, bringing regular and high rainfall, and by the Azores anticyclone in summer, making the summer months hot and dry. Winters in the region are cold and prolonged while the summers are cool and short. The annual rainfall in the area is between 600 and 700mm in the lower areas of the region, and between 1000 and 1200mm in the higher areas.

== Ecology ==
The fly orchid Ophrys insectifera] is listed in the Red Data Book of the Republic of Bulgaria, and the Red List of the Bulgarian Vascular Plants as one of the rarest and most threatened flora in Bulgaria and is protected by the Biodiversity Act. In 2004, this plant was discovered in the Buynovsko Gorge.

One forest location on the gorge is home to well developed Pinus nigra and Abies alba forests, where the ground is often covered by thick moss, consisting of Rhytidiadelphus triquetrus, and Hylocomium splendens. In this area, the herbaceous layer is composed of Sesleria latifolia, Euphorbia amygdaloides, Geranium sanguineum, Hieracium murorum, Monotropa hypopitys, and the rare Goodyera repens.

Another forest location on the gorge can be characterized as a mixed forest of conifers and beeches. Here, a variety of plants can be found, including: Ostrya carpinifolia, Fagus sylvatica, Juniperus communis, Genista carinalis, Abies alba. The herbaceous layer consists primarily of Sesleria latifolia, Poa pratensis and to a lesser degree, Centaurea triumfettii, Globularia aphyllanthes, Dorycnium herbaceum, Astragalus monspessulanum, Knautia drimaeja, Hieracium murorum, and Leontodon crispus.

== Sources ==
- Георгиев (Georgiev), Владимир (Vladimir); et al. (1986). Енциклопедия България [Encyclopaedia Bulgaria] (in Bulgarian). Vol. V. P-R. Sofia: Издателство на БАН (Bulgarian Academy of Sciences Press).
- Мичев (Michev), Николай (Nikolay); Михайлов (Mihaylov), Цветко (Tsvetko); Вапцаров (Vaptsarov), Иван (Ivan); Кираджиев (Kiradzhiev), Светлин (Svetlin) (1980). Географски речник на България [Geographic Dictionary of Bulgaria] (in Bulgarian). Sofia: Наука и култура (Nauka i kultura).
- Димитрова (Dimitrova), Людмила (Lyudmila) (2004). Национален парк "Пирин". План за управление [Pirin National Park. Management Plan] (in Bulgarian). и колектив. Sofia: Ministry of Environment and Water, Bulgarian Foundation "Biodiversity".
