= Red List of the Bulgarian Vascular Plants =

Red List of Bulgarian Vascular Plants
- Author: Anchev, M., Apostolova, I., Assyov, B., Bancheva, S., Denchev C., Dimitrov, D., Dimitrova, D., Evstatieva, L., Genova, E., Georgiev, V., Goranova, V., Gussev, C., Ignatova, P., Ivanova, D., Meshinev, T., Peev, D., Pterova, A., Petrova, A. S., Sopotlieva, D., Stanev, S., Stoeva, M., Stoyanov, S., Tashev, A., Tosheva, A., Tsoneva, A., Tzonev, R., Vitkova, A., Vladimorov, V.
- Genre: Scientific literature, Conservation Biology, Biodiversity, Biological Science
- Publisher: Phytologia Baltanica
- Publication date: 2009
- Publication place: Bulgaria
- Pages: 63 - 94

List by Bulgarian Academy of Sciences

See here for a comprehensive list of IUCN Red Lists

See here for a comprehensive List of Red Lists by country.

The Red List of Bulgarian Vascular Plants is a detailed publication that catalogues the national threat status of 801 species of vascular plants from Bulgaria. This list has been evaluated using Version 3.1 of the IUCN Red List Categories and Criteria.

== See also ==
- Geography of Bulgaria
- Red Data Book of the Republic of Bulgaria
- List of protected areas of Bulgaria
- List of mammals of Bulgaria
- List of birds of Bulgaria
- List of reptiles of Bulgaria
- List of amphibians of Bulgaria
