= Tsarichina Reserve =

Nature reserve in Bulgaria

- IUCN category Ia (strict nature reserve)
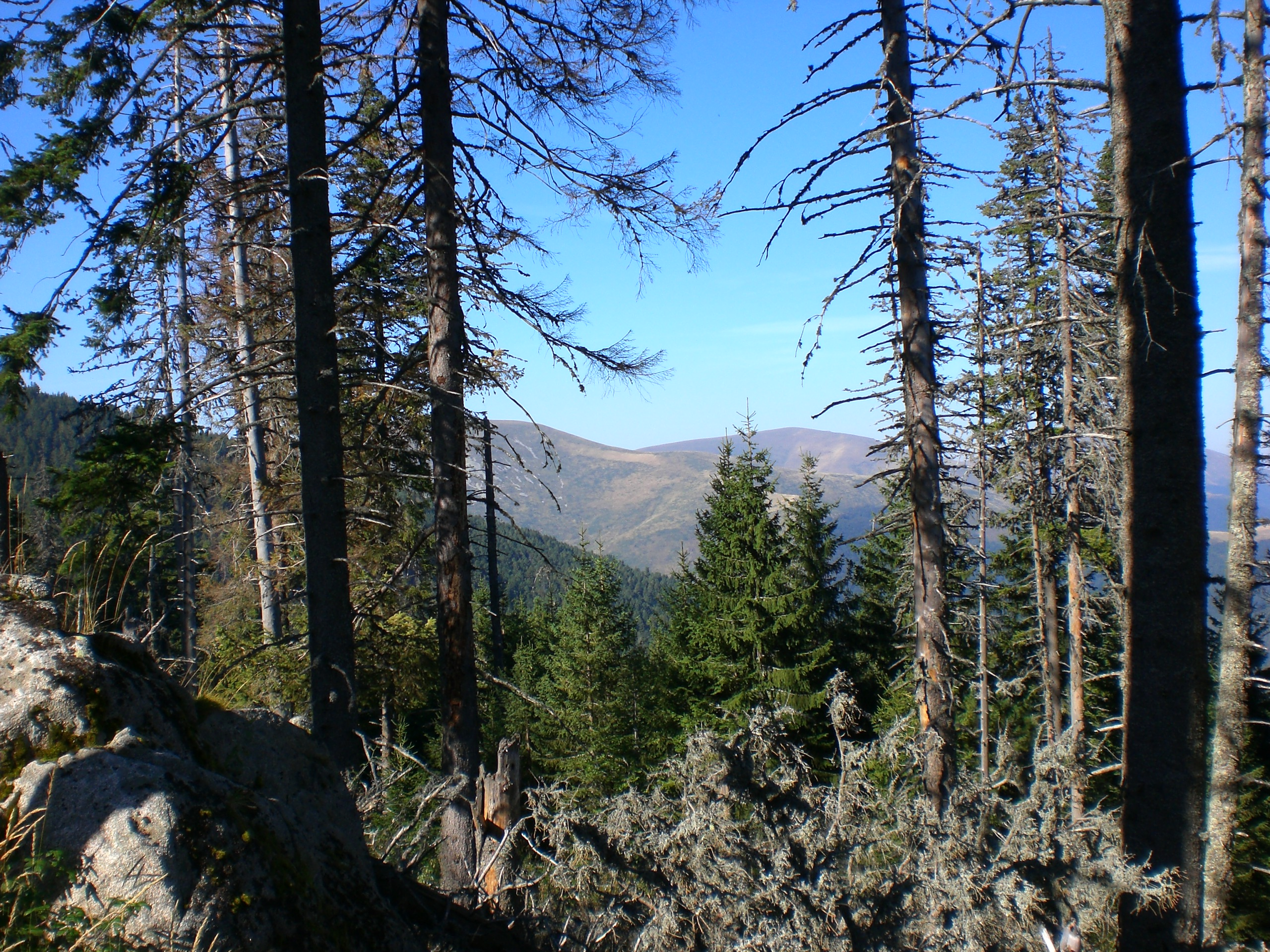

- Location within Bulgaria
- Location: Teteven Municipality, Lovech Province, Bulgaria
- Nearest city: Teteven
- Coordinates: 42°46′19″N 24°24′44″E
- Area: 34.18 km^{2} (13.20 sq mi)
- Established: 1949
- Governing body: Ministry of Environment and Water

Tsarichina (Bulgarian: Царичина) is a nature reserve in Central Balkan National Park, located in the Balkan Mountains of central Bulgaria. It spans a territory of 3418 ha or 34.18 km^{2} and was declared in July 1949 to protect the only population of Macedonian pine in the mountain range. In 2016 the national park, including Tsarichina, was declared a UNESCO Biosphere Reserve. It is a strict nature reserve (1st category protected territory according to Bulgarian legislation and IUCN classification).

== Geography ==
Tsarichina is situated in the western part of the Central Balkan National Park in the upper part of the catchment area of the Beli Vit, one of the two main stems of the river Vit, an important Bulgarian tributary of the Danube. Spanning north of the summit of Vezhen (2,198 m), the reserve is situated at altitudes between 850 m and 2,198 m. Administratively, it is part of Teteven Municipality, Lovech Province, within the area of the village of Ribaritsa.

== Flora ==
The reserve includes the only population of Macedonian pine (Pinus peuce) in the central Balkan Mountain. Most of the reserve is forested, predominantly by European beech (Fagus sylvatica), Norway spruce (Picea abies) and European silver fir (Abies alba). Other common deciduous trees include European hornbeam (Carpinus betulus) and Heldreich's maple (Acer heldreichii). In the sub-Alpine zone there are bush formations of common juniper (Juniperus communis), Balkan heath (Erica spiculifolia), blueberries (Vaccinium sps.), etc. The number of vascular plant species is about 600, including rare and endemic plants, such as Trollius europaeus, Anemonastrum narcissiflorum, Lilium jankae, Pilosella merxmuelleriana, Viola balcanica, Ostericum palustre, Centaurea kernerana, etc.

== Fauna ==
The fauna of the reserve is diverse, with a number of rare species of conversational importance. Among the resident mammals are brown bear, gray wolf, red fox, beech marten, European pine marten, Eurasian otter, wild boar, red deer, roe deer and others. There are at least 75 species of nesting birds, such as European honey buzzard, Eurasian eagle-owl, boreal owl, Ural owl, rock partridge, hazel grouse, white-backed woodpecker, black woodpecker, stock dove, red-breasted flycatcher, etc.

The herpetofauna includes 15 amphibian and reptile species. The former include fire salamander, marsh frog, common frog, agile frog, European tree frog, yellow-bellied toad, common European adder, grass snake, Aesculapian snake, European green lizard, sand lizard, viviparous lizard, common wall lizard, etc. Fish species include the river trout, commonly found in the streams, and the Vit sculpin, endemic to the catchment area of the Beli Vit.

== Gallery ==
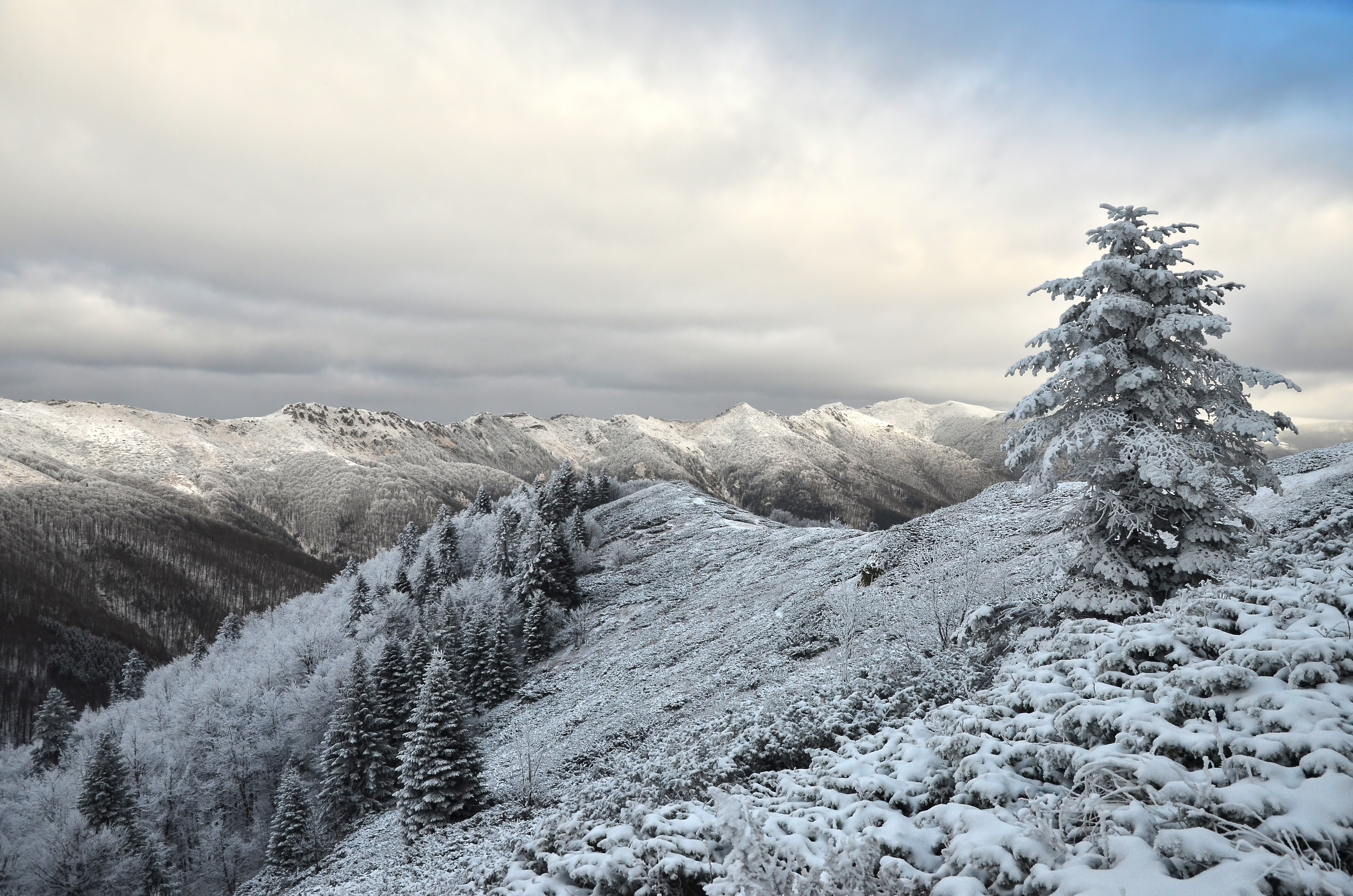
Kozya Stena Reserve from Tsarichina

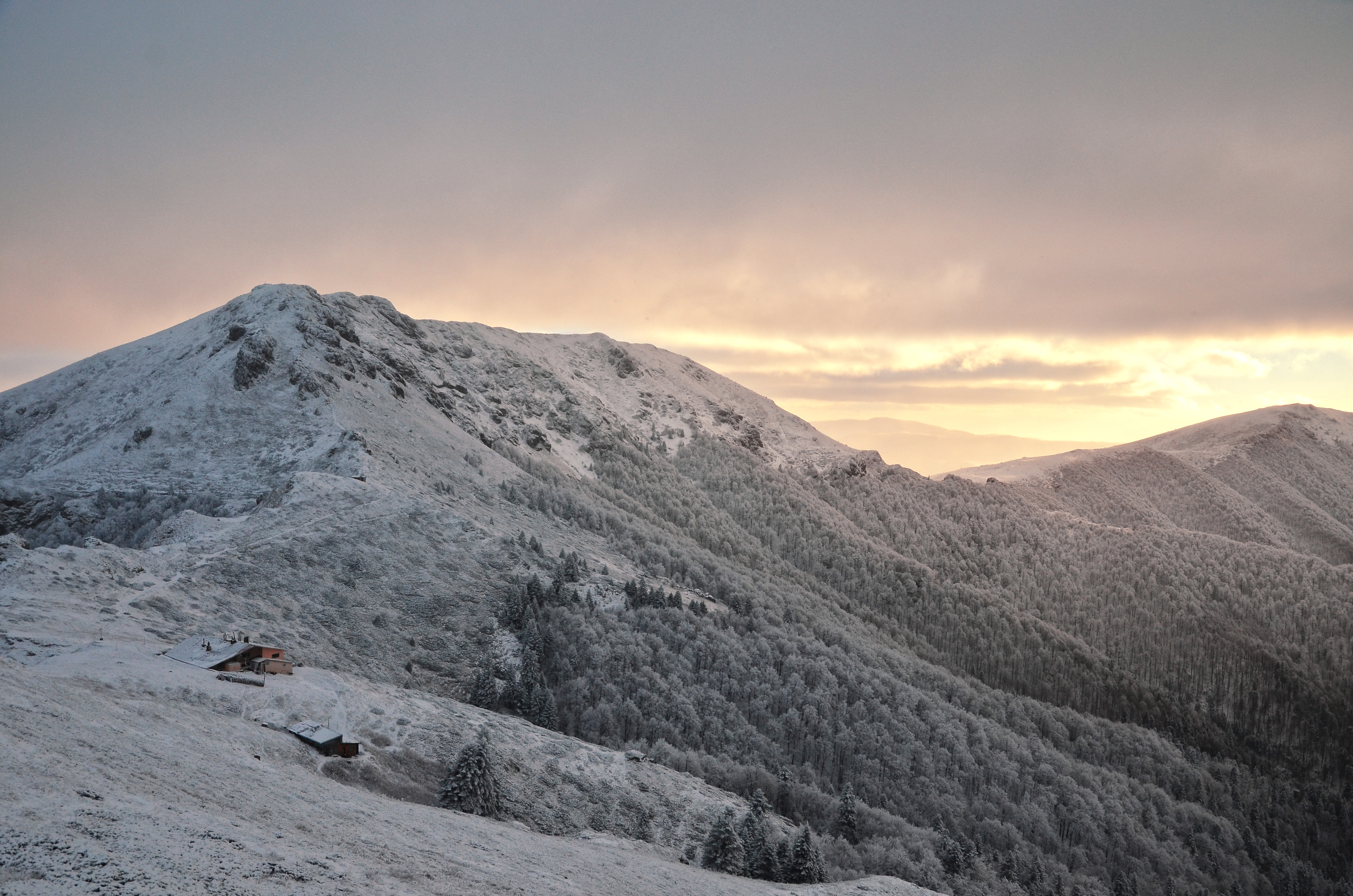
Tsarichina in winter

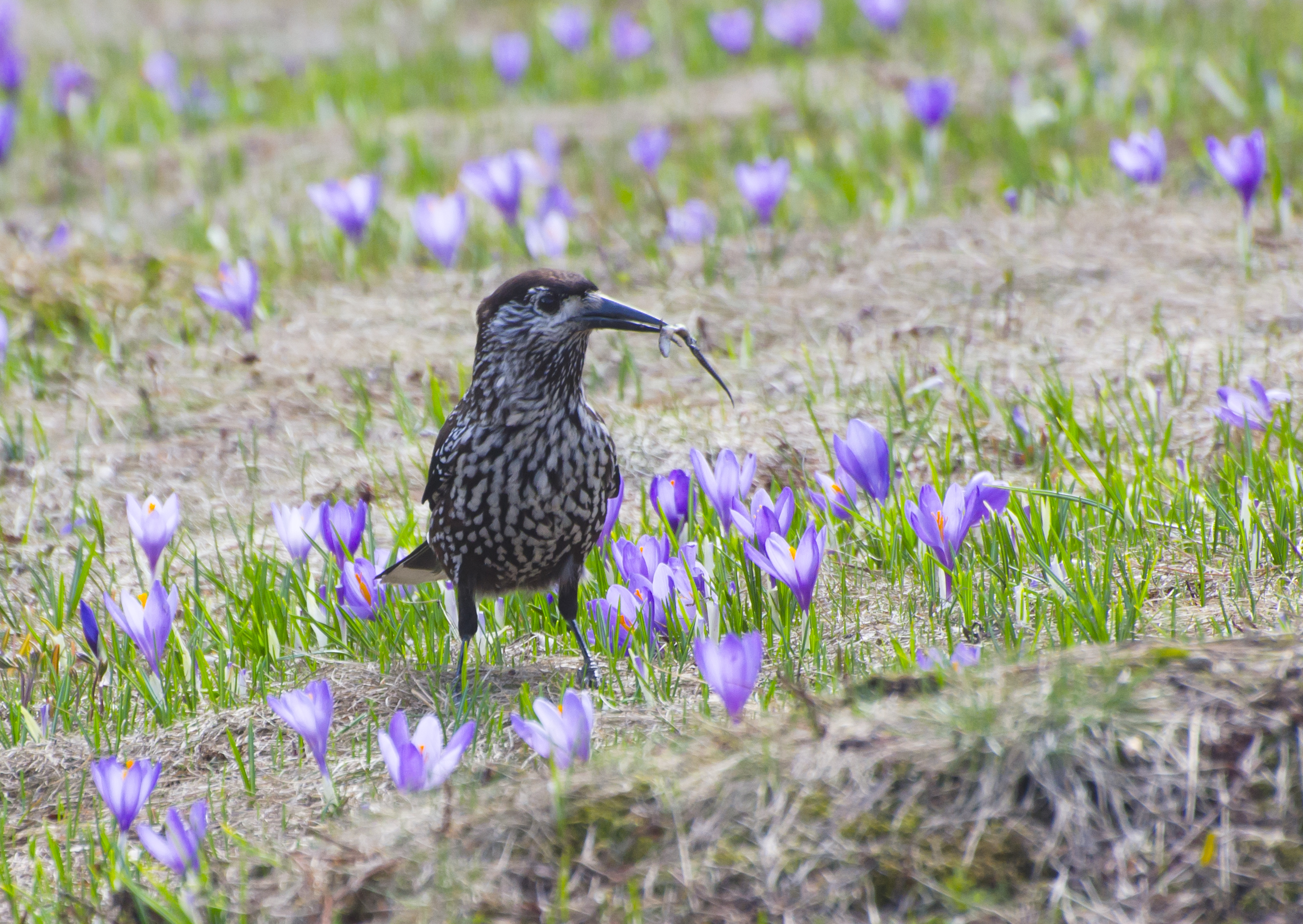
A northern nutcracker in the reserve
