= Bogdan Reserve =

Nature reserve in central Bulgaria

Bogdan Nature Reserve
- IUCN category Ia (strict nature reserve)
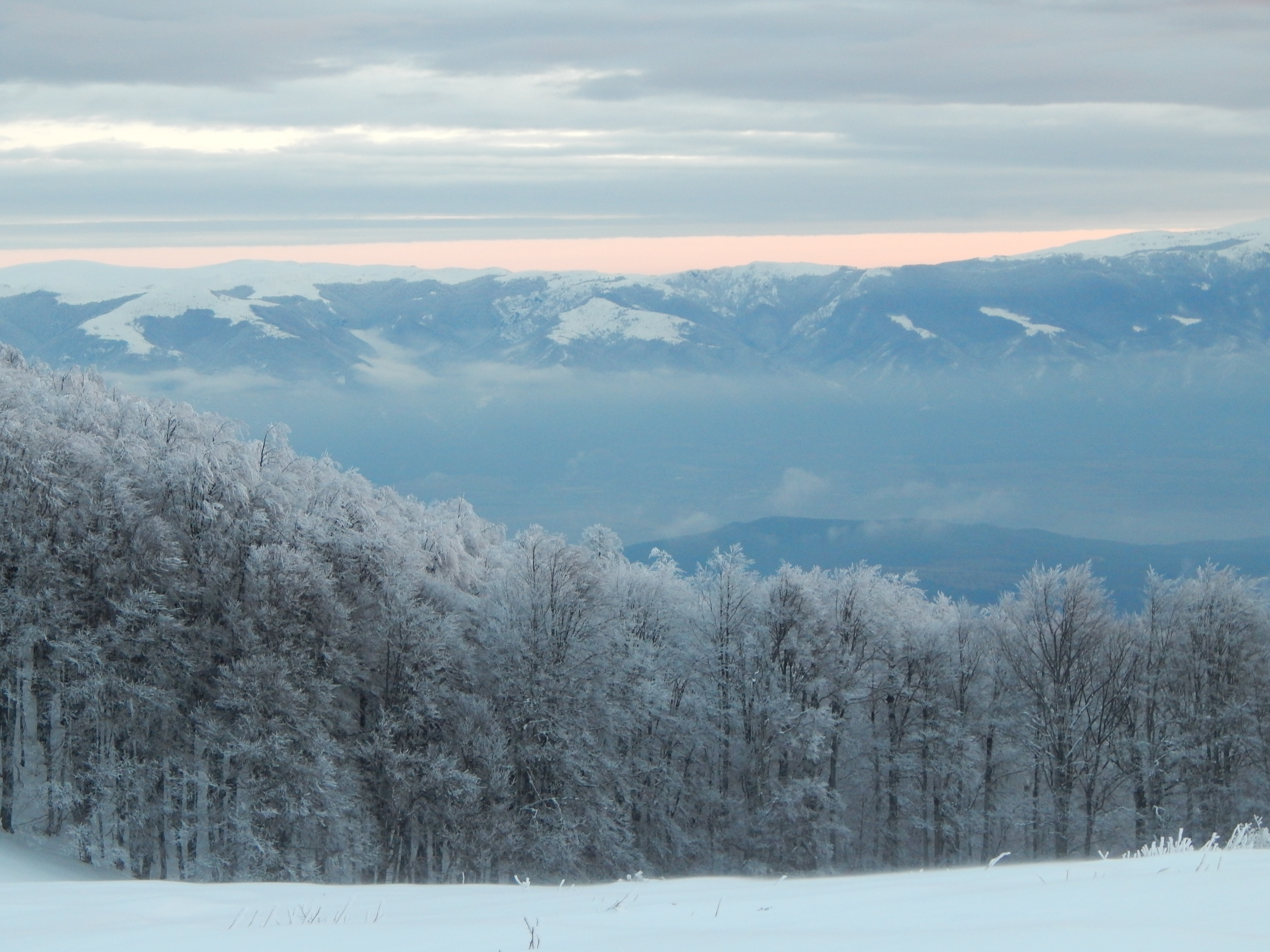

- Location within Bulgaria
- Location: Koprivshtitsa Municipality, Sofia Province, Bulgaria
- Nearest city: Koprivshtitsa
- Coordinates: 42°36′26.2″N 24°27′41.4″E
- Area: 1.13 km^{2} (0.44 sq mi)
- Established: 1972
- Governing body: Ministry of Environment and Water

Bogdan (Bulgarian: Богдан) is a small managed reserve in the central parts of the Sredna Gora mountain range of central Bulgaria. Administratively it falls in Koprivshtitsa Municipality of Sofia Province, with a very small area extending to the neighbouring Karlovo Municipality of Plovdiv Province. The nearest towns are Koprivshtitsa and Klisura.

== Statute and geography ==
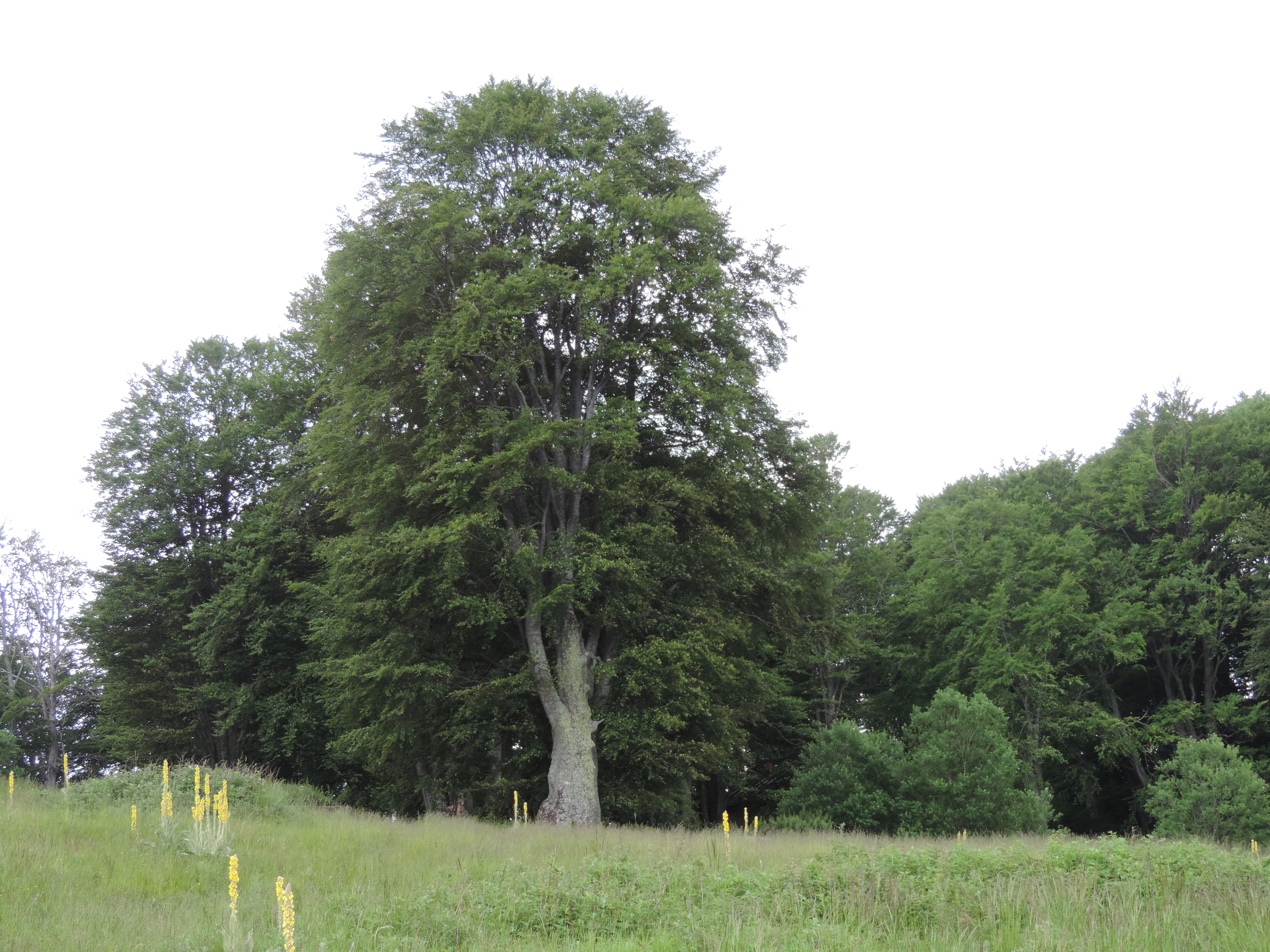
European beech forest in Bogdan

Bogdan was declared a nature reserve on 29 March 1972 to protect an old-growth beech forest and recategorized as a managed reserve in 1999. It spans an area of 113 ha or 1.13 km^{2}. In addition there is a buffer zone of 121 ha. Its territory is state-owned.

The reserve is situated in the highest parts of the Sredna Gora mountain range and includes its highest point, the summit of Golyam Bogdan (1,604 m), after which it is named. The lowest point within its territory is 1,360 m, accounting for a denivelation of 244 m. The average altitude is 1,482 m. There are not permanent rivers within the limited territory of Bogdan but the river Topolnitsa just southwest of the reserve and its right stem the Kriva spring in its vicinity on the northern slopes. On the southern slopes flow small streams forming one of the main stems of the river Luda Yana, while on the northeastern slopes several small streams belong to the Stryama basin. The soils are Cambisols.

The ecosystems of the reserve are relatively homogeneous and the predominant biotope are the European beech (Fagus sylvatica) forests some 140–170 years old on average. Meadows form the only other biotope, covered a limited area of 4.6 ha.

== Flora ==
There are 286 species of vascular plants, as well as 32 species of moss. There are two Balkan endemic species, Pastinaca hirsuta and Campanula sparsa, as well as one included in the Red Book of Bulgaria, Elwes's snowdrop (Galanthus elwesii). There are a number of orchids, such as white helleborine (Cephalanthera damasonium), narrow-leaved helleborine (Cephalanthera longifolia), elder-flowered orchid (Dactylorhiza sambucina), fragrant orchid (Gymnadenia conopsea), bird's-nest orchid (Neottia nidus-avis), green-winged orchid (Anacamptis morio), lesser butterfly-orchid (Platanthera bifolia). Other species of conservational importance include Geum rhodopeum, Hesperis sylvestris and round-leaved sundew (Drosera rotundifolia).

== Fauna ==
The number of recorded mammal species is 31, of them 10 large mammals, 12 small mammals and 9 bats. They include European pine marten, beech marten, red fox, European wildcat, wild boar, etc. Brown bears and gray wolves have been registered in Bogdan but do not inhabit it permanently. Bats of conservation importance are lesser noctule, western barbastelle and Bechstein's bat.

The ornithofauna (birds) includes 88 nesting species in the reserve's limited territory. Six taxa are included in the Red Book of Bulgaria, lesser spotted eagle, eastern imperial eagle, saker falcon, hazel grouse, white-backed woodpecker and horned lark. The herpetofauna is also varied and includes ten amphibian and six reptile species. The former include fire salamander, alpine newt, yellow-bellied toad and common frog.

The invertebrate fauna is poorly researched and understood.

== Gallery ==
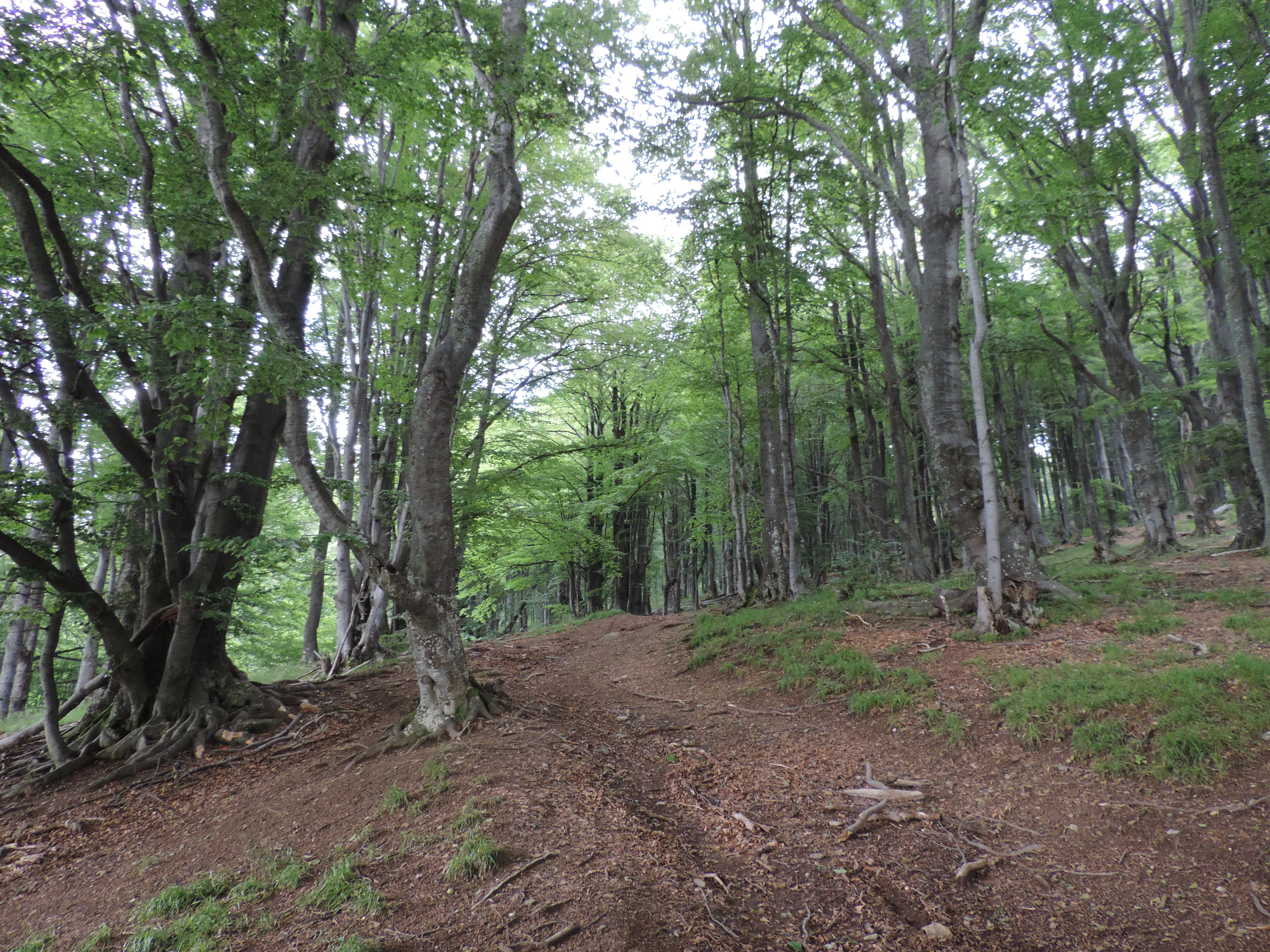
Beech forest

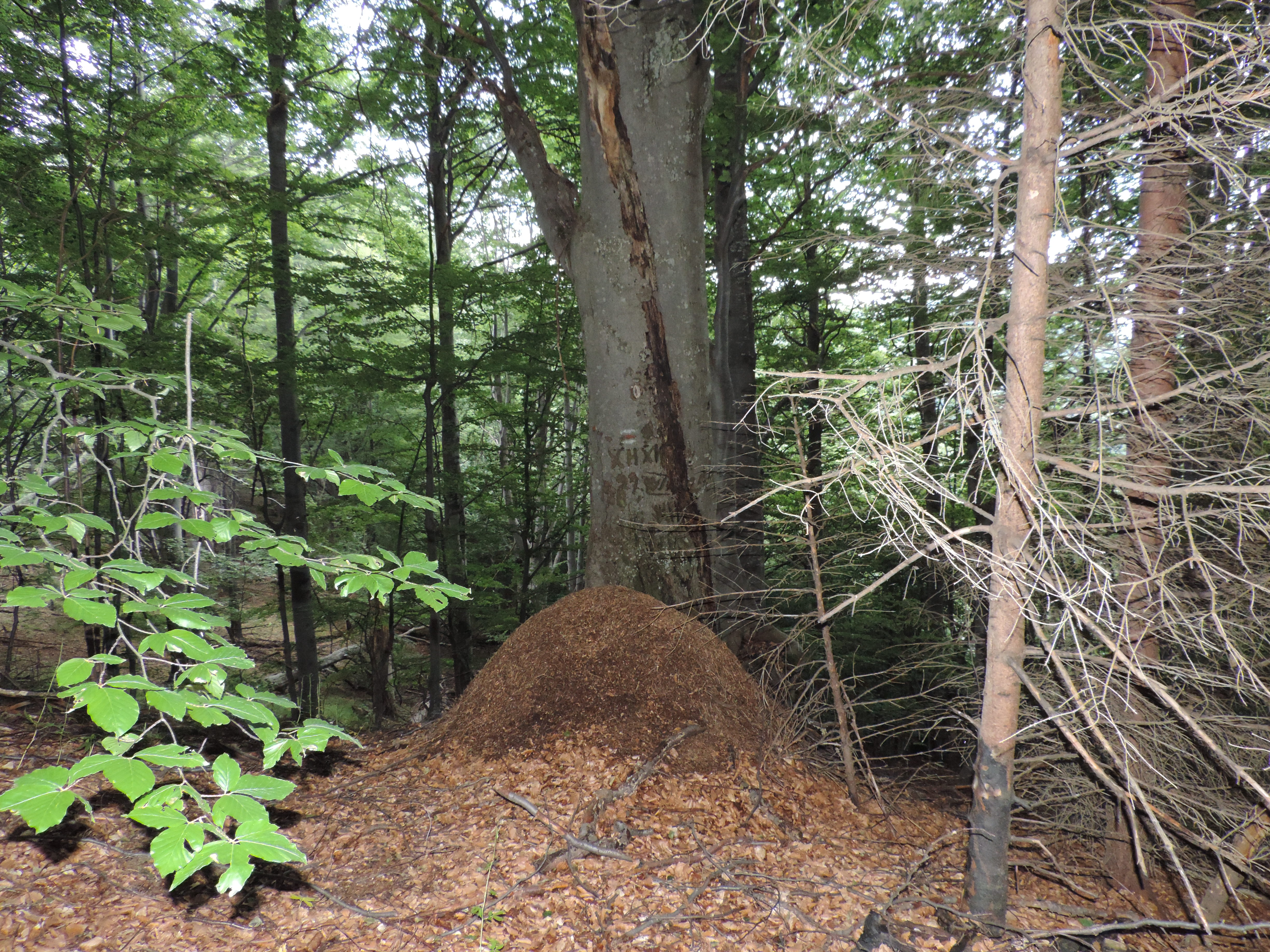
Ant nest in the forest

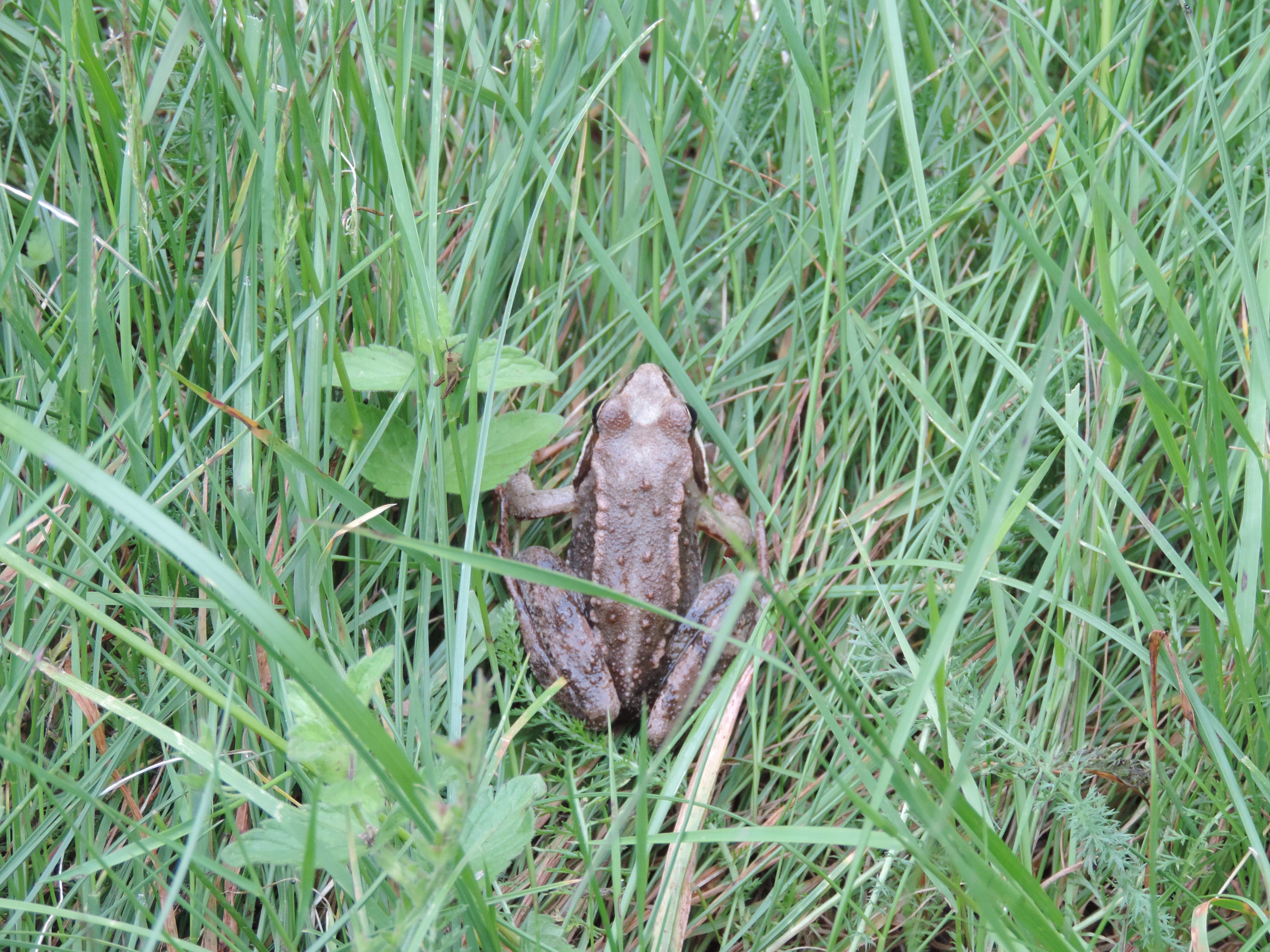
Common frog in Bogdan
