= Vladimir Beshkov =

Bulgarian zoologist (1935–2019)

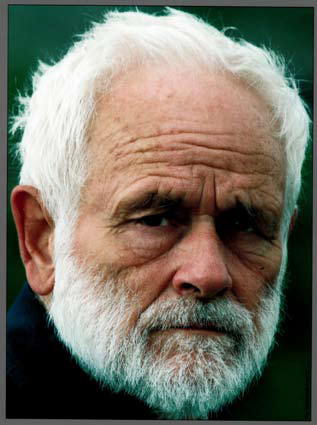
- Born: 10 September 1935; Sofia, Bulgaria
- Died: 23 October 2019 (aged 84); Sofia, Bulgaria
- Citizenship: Bulgarian
- Education: Sofia University
- Scientific career
- Fields: zoology herpetology
- Workplaces: Bulgarian Academy of Sciences

Vladimir Atanasov Beshkov (Bulgarian: Владимир Анастасов Бешков; 10 September 1935 – 23 October 2019) was a Bulgarian zoologist and herpetologist who worked at the Institute of Zoology to the Bulgarian Academy of Sciences.

== Biography ==
Vladimir Beshkov was born in Sofia on 10 September 1935 in the family of the Bulgarian geographer Prof. Anastas Beshkov, a member of the Bulgarian Academy of Sciences. He spent his childhood in the town of Svishtov in the north of Bulgaria, where his father worked. In 1959, he graduated from the Faculty of Biology, Geology and Geography at Sofia University and began working at the Institute of Zoology to the Bulgarian Academy of Science. In 1978, he defended a dissertation on the ecological and biological characteristics of snakes in Maleshevo Mountain; in 1995 he retired as an associate professor. His son Stoyan Beshov is an entomologist at the National Museum of Natural History in Sofia.

== Research ==
Vladimir Beshkov was an important figure in Bulgarian herpetology. Of particular importance are his contributions to the study of the biology of snakes from the Maleshevo Mountain in western Bulgaria, where 2/3 of all snake species in the country are recorded. Another natural phenomenon discovered by Beshkov was the seasonal vertical migration of the common frog (Rana temporaria) in the Muhalnitsa locality near the town of Botevgrad, situated in a valley in the Balkan Mountains. In addition to supplementing the knowledge about the biology and behavior of this species, his research also contributed to Muhalnitsa becoming the first protected area in Bulgaria, declared exclusively for the purpose of preserving an amphibian species. His research on the Greek stream frog (Rana graeca) was of great importance for the biology research of that relatively poorly studied amphibian species. His contribution to the herpetological fauna of Bulgaria and the work on the distribution models for the various amphibian and reptile species in Bulgaria was of notable significance. In the late 1970s, Beshkov started a campaign to protect the turtles of Bulgaria and later expanded this work to other Bulgarian species of reptiles and amphibians, and as a result was responsible for some legislative changes in this regard. Among his main contributions were the texts on amphibians and reptiles in the first and second editions of the Red Book of Bulgaria. He was also a consultant in a number of popular science films about wildlife and a recipient of high international awards.

Vladimir Beshkov was also an experienced cave explorer and together with zoologist Prof. Peter Beron visited, and in some cases discovered, various caves around the world. He was the author of 83 scientific publications on the taxonomy, ecology, biology and distribution of Bulgarian species of bats, amphibians and reptiles. During his travels, Beshkov also collected various invertebrates. Named after him are a genus of cave beetles (Beskovia), as well as 12 species and subspecies of animals from different taxa (Nematoda, Isopoda, Chilopoda, Diplopoda, Araneae, Acari, Coleoptera, Amphibia) from Bulgaria, Greece, Indonesia and Uganda.
