= Bogdan (disambiguation) =

Bogdan is a given name of Slavic origin and a surname.

Bogdan may also refer to:

== Geography and places ==
- Boğdan, alternate Turkish name for Moldavia, a region and former principality in Europe
- Bogdan (peak), in the Sredna Gora mountain range in Bulgaria
- Bogdan Reserve, a nature reserve in Sredna Gora, Bulgaria
- Bohdan, Podlaskie Voivodeship, a village in the northeastern Poland

== Business ==
- Bogdan group, an automobile manufacturer in Ukraine that specializes in producing buses
  - Bogdan (bus model)

== See also ==
- Bohdan (disambiguation)
