= Muhalnitsa =

Protected area in Bulgaria

Protected area “Muhalnitsa”
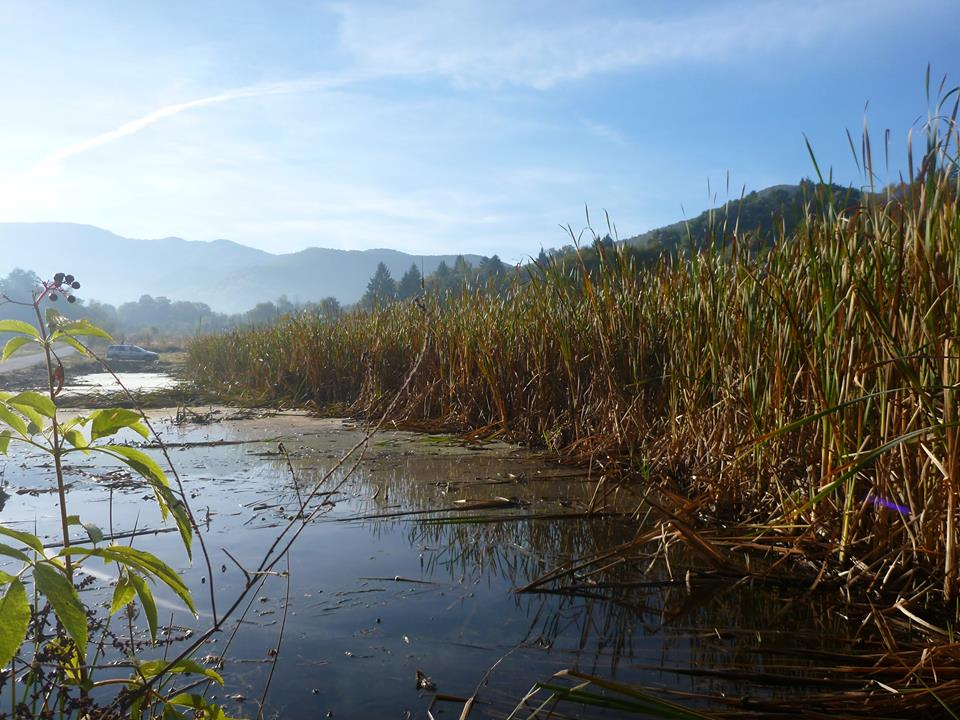

- Location within Bulgaria
- Location: Botevgrad, Bulgaria
- Coordinates: 42.893°N 23.789°E
- Area: 1,9 hectares
- Established: 8 May 1992

Muhalnitsa (Bulgarian: Мухалница) is a protected area in western Bulgaria, located at one kilometre south of the town of Botevgrad and at 63 km north-east of the capital Sofia. It is situated in the Botevgrad Valley in the western section of the Balkan Mountains. ”Muhalnitsa” was established in 1992 to protect a unique breeding migration of the common frog (Rana temporaria). Administratively, it is part of Botevgrad Municipality of Sofia Province.

== History of the site ==
On 14 February 1968 zoologist Vladimir Beshkov discovered several hundred common frogs (Rana temporaria) in a small swamp at an altitude of 360 m near the town of Botevgrad which was very unusual for this species at such a low altitude. On 1 March and 4 March 1971 he marked several hundred specimens and released them back into the swamp. On 4 June 1971 one of the marked frogs was found on the slopes of the Bilo mountain at a distance of 4925 m on a straight line from the swamp and at 875 m.a.s.l. After a hiatus of several years, Beshkov renewed his studies in 1979, when between 31 January and 3 March, 457 common frogs were marked in the swamp. Frogs were also marked while moving down the rivers in February and March 1980 at 5.5 and 6 km above the swamp, high in the Bilo mountain. On 11 March 1980 two of them were found in the “Muhalnitsa” swamp (one 4, the other 11 days after marking). Beshkov published his research in a series of scientific and popular science papers which served as a basis for the establishment of the area from the swamp to the Old (Zelin) River as a protected area in 1992

== History of the migration ==
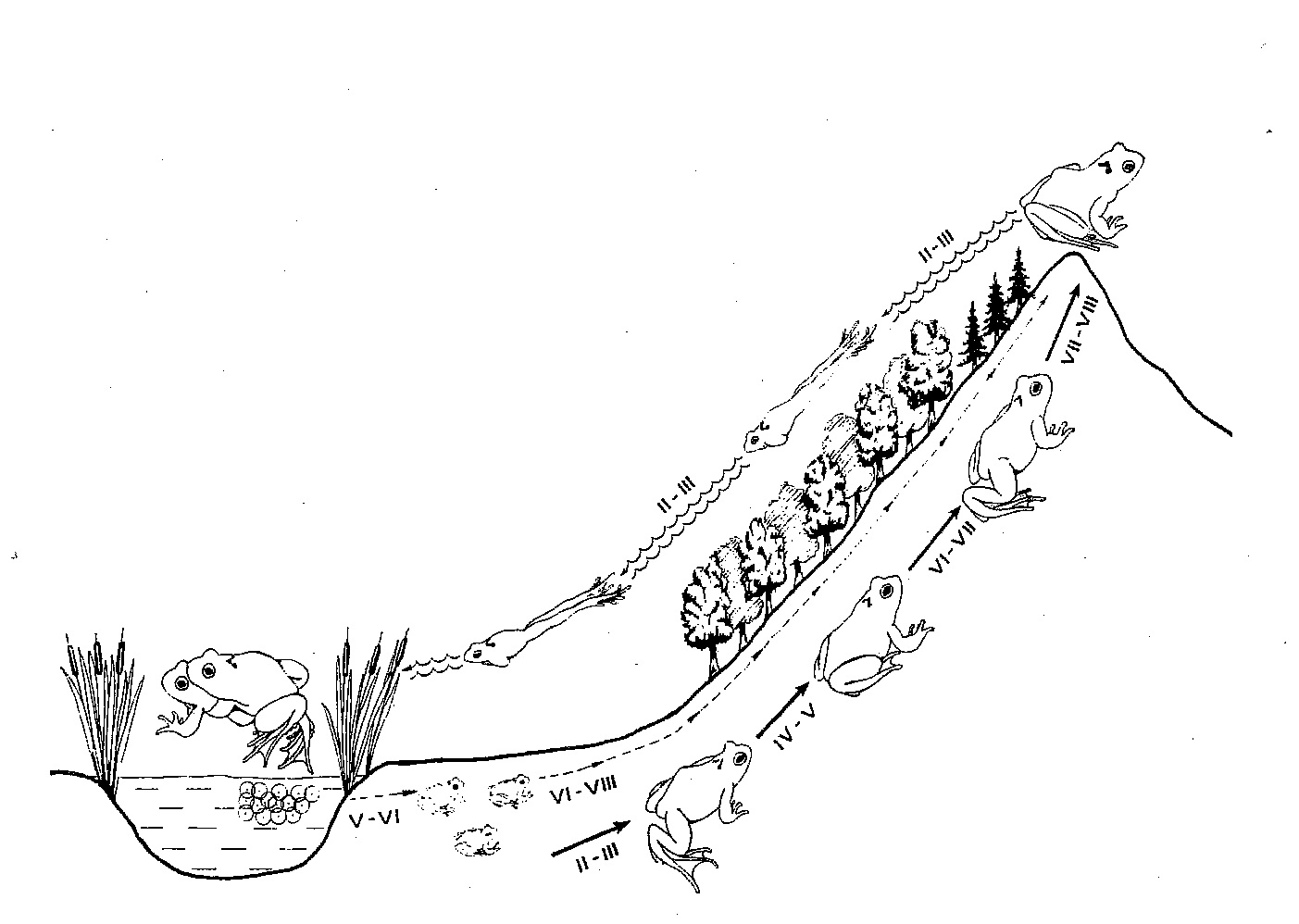
Migration of the common frog in protected area “Muhalnitsa”. Roman digits indicate the months of the year.

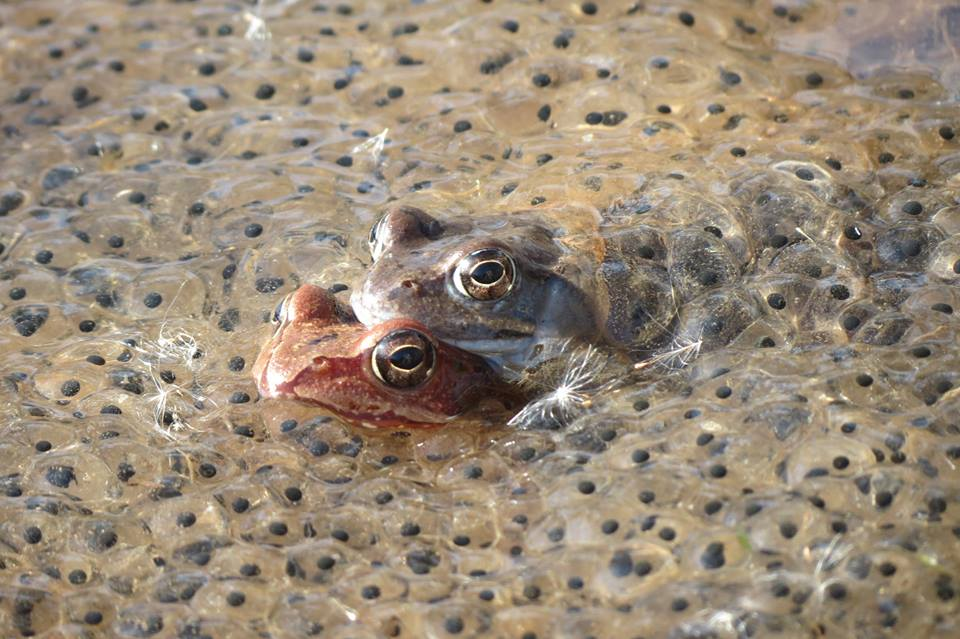
A pair of common frogs among deposited eggs in “Muhalnitsa”.

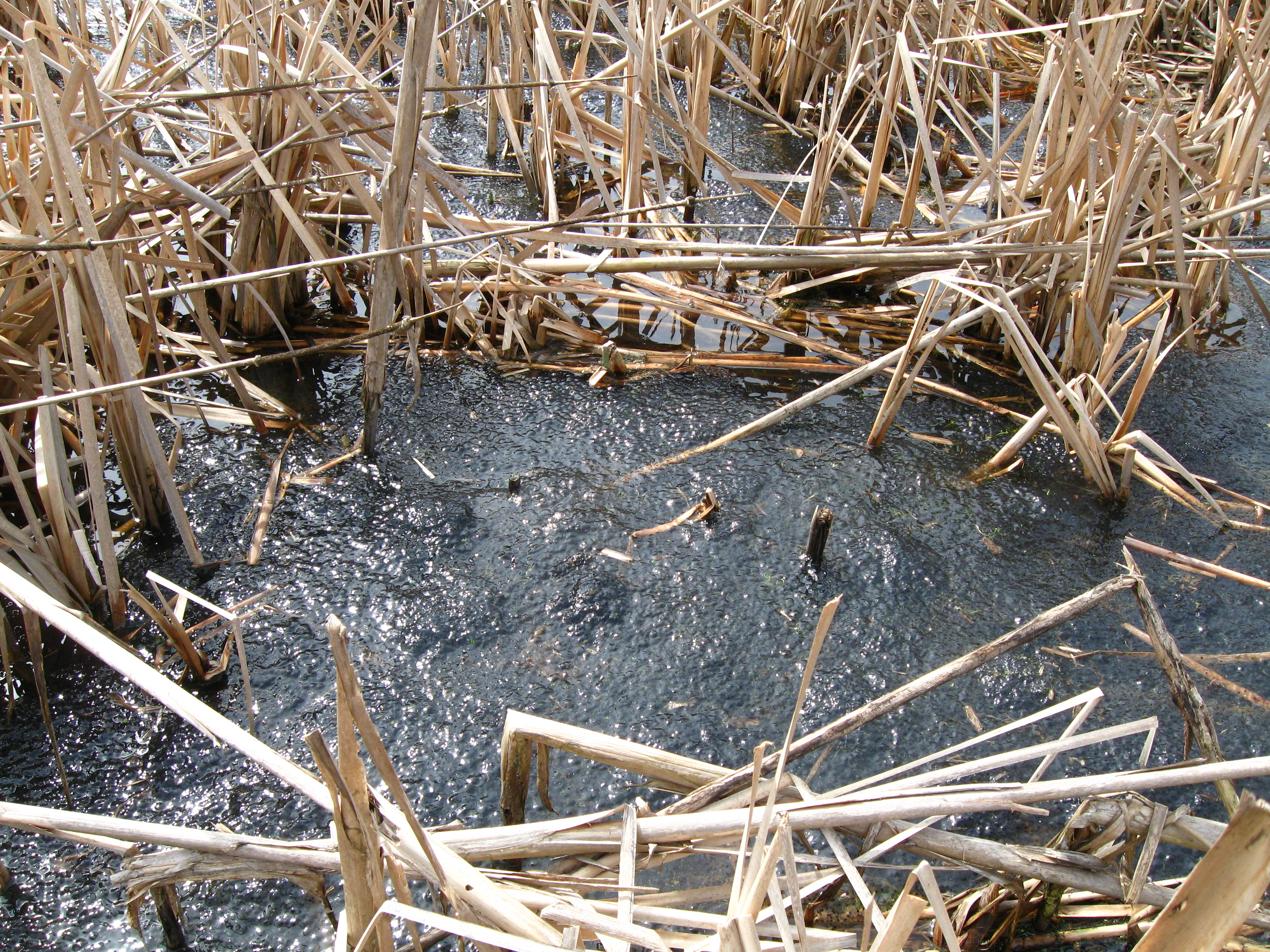
In the height of the breeding season almost all of the water surface is covered with eggs.

The mass arrival of thousands of frogs in the swamp in the area of “Muhalnitsa” has probably began in the end of the last glacial period, i.e. around 8000 years ago. During this annual breeding migration from their hibernation habitats (rivers and streams in the high parts of the mountain) to the “Muhalnitsa” swamp, the common frogs cover distances of up to 6 km, and some of them probably over 10 km. The breeding season lasts only about two weeks, usually in the end of February or the beginning of March, depending on ambient temperature. Pairs of breeding frogs and deposited eggs among the still melting ice is a common sight. The frogs move down the Zelin River and instinctively know when to leave it in order to reach the swamp. After the end of the breeding season, adult frogs return to the high parts of the mountain by land, covering approximately the same distances. Tadpoles hatch from the fertilized eggs, metamorphose into froglets and leave the swamp by the end of May and the beginning of June. This breeding migration is unique for the species and is among the longest known migrations in the world of amphibians.

== Other amphibian and reptile species ==
In addition to the common frog, 8 other amphibian species have been registered in the swamp: common newt (Lissotriton vulgaris), Balkan crested newt (Triturus ivanbureschi), yellow-bellied toad (Bombina variegata), common toad (Bufo bufo ), European green toad (Bufotes viridis), tree frog (Hyla orientalis), agile frog (Rana dalmatina) and marsh frog (Pelophylax ridibundus). There is also a single registration of European pond turtle (Emys orbicularis). This relatively rich biodiversity in a rather small area confirms the significance of protected area “Muhalnitsa” for the conservation of the local fauna.

== Threats and counter-measures ==
In the last 10 years there is a marked increase in the swamp size as well as overgrowing with bulrush (Typha sp.). This is due to a prolonged leakage from the pipes of the local water and sanitation facility and has a pronounced negative effect on the frogs, which need open water in order to breed. This leakage has probably influenced the water regime of the swamp, changing it from a temporary pond into a permanent one (with better conditions for the bulrush). The progressive growth of the bulrush will probably lead to another change, with the entire swamp drying off. This would mean that in the following years the local common frog population will lose its main breeding site, and the unique migration will cease. This threat would also affect all other amphibian and reptile species in the protected area.

Another significant threat to the frogs is the mass mortality on the asphalt road running along the north-eastern bank of the swamp. Migrating frogs that come from the river must cross the road to reach the swamp (except the few individuals that pass through the drainage pipe under the road). Vehicle traffic is not intensive, but nevertheless during the breeding season, the road is covered with ran-over dead frogs.

In 2017 the municipality of Botevgrad, together with zoologists from the Bulgarian Academy of Sciences, undertook a series of measures aimed at overcoming these threats by uprooting the bulrush and safe-proofing the road with animal passage pipes.

== See also ==
- Geography of Bulgaria
- List of protected areas of Bulgaria
- List of amphibians of Bulgaria
- Balkan Mountains
