= Red Data Book of the Republic of Bulgaria =

2011, 2012, 2015 books by Bulgarian Academy of Sciences

Red Data Books of the Republic of Bulgaria
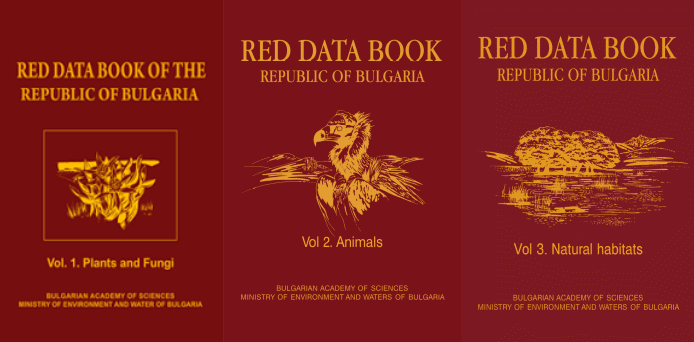
- Volume 1 (2011) Volume 2 (2012) Volume 3 (2015)
- Author: Peev, D., Petrova, A.S., Anchev, M., Temniskova, D., Denchev, C.M., Ganeva, A., Gussev, Ch., Vladimirov, V., Golemansky, V., Beron, P., Zivkov, M., Popov, A., Popov, V., Beschkov, V., Deltshev, C., Michev, T., Spassov, N., Stoev, P., Dobrev, D., Biserkov, V., Gussev, C., Hibaum, G., Roussakova, V., Pandurski, I., Uzunov, Y., Marius, D., Tzonev, R., Tsoneva, S.
- Translator: Dessislava Dimitrova
- Genre: Scientific literature, Conservation Biology, Biodiversity, Biological Science
- Publisher: Ministry of Environment and Water of Bulgaria
- Publication date: 2011, 2012, 2015
- Publication place: Bulgaria
- Pages: Vol. 1: 447; Vol. 2: 330; Vol. 3: 422

Red Data Book of the Republic of Bulgaria (Bulgarian: Червена книга на Република България) consists of detailed publications that catalog the status of endangered and threatened species in the country. These books play an important role in the conservation of biodiversity by identifying species at risk of extinction and documenting their current status. They provide thorough information on various species, as well as their habitats, threats, and the conservation measures needed to protect them. Additionally, they serve as educational resources, raising awareness about the importance of protecting Bulgaria's biodiversity. Compiled by scientists, researchers, and conservationists, the Red Data Books are used by environmental organizations, policymakers, and academics to support and implement conservation initiatives.

== History of Red Data Books ==
The history of the Red Books can be traced back to the International Union for Conservation of Nature (IUCN), which conceived the idea in the 1960s. The Red Data Book was created as a comprehensive tool to assess and document species at risk of extinction. It aimed to provide detailed information on species’ populations, distribution, and the threats they faced.

Initially, the Red Data Book focused on global species, serving as a resource for identifying conservation priorities and guiding protective measures. Over time, the concept expanded to include national versions, focusing on the specific needs and conditions of individual countries. These national Red Data Books adapted the global framework to local contexts, offering understandings of regional species and their conservation status.

== See also ==
- Geography of Bulgaria
- List of protected areas of Bulgaria
- List of mammals of Bulgaria
- List of birds of Bulgaria
- List of reptiles of Bulgaria
- List of amphibians of Bulgaria
