= Grohotno =

Grohotno Грохотно
- Location of Grohotno, Bulgaria
- Coordinates: 41°41′56.21″N 24°22′42.29″E
- Country: Bulgaria
- Provinces (Oblast): Smolyan Province

Government
  - Mayor: Dzhamal Chitak
- Elevation: 813 m (2,667 ft)

Population (15.09.2022)
  - Total: 856
- Time zone: UTC+2 (EET)
  - Summer (DST): UTC+3 (EEST)
- Postal Code: 4815
- Area codes: 030417 from Bulgaria, 0035930417 from outside

Grohotno (Bulgarian: Грохотно) is a village in southern Bulgaria. It has a population of 856 as of 2022.

== Geography ==
Grohotno is located in the western part of Smolyan Province and has a territory of 22.373 km^{2}. It is part of Devin Municipality. The closest settlements are the town of Devin to the northeast and the village of Teshel to the southeast. The village is situated in the western part of the Rhodope Mountains on the river Vacha.
