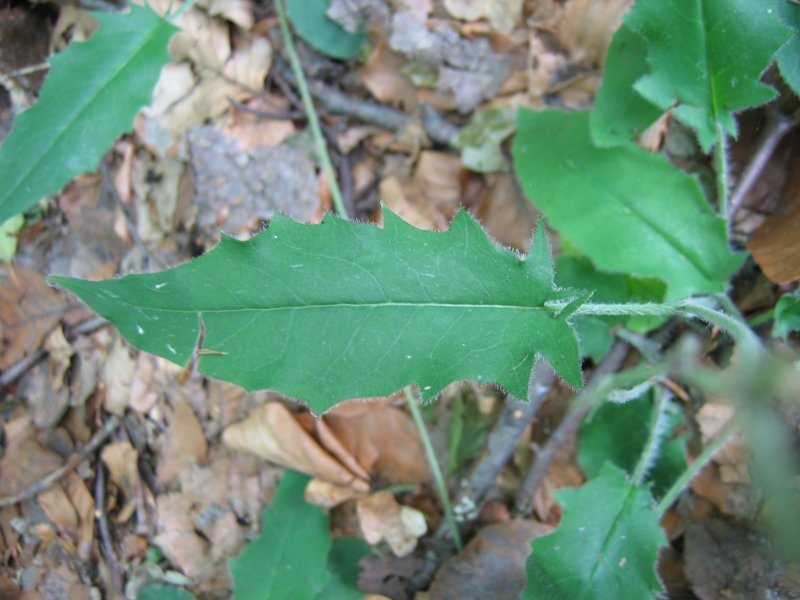

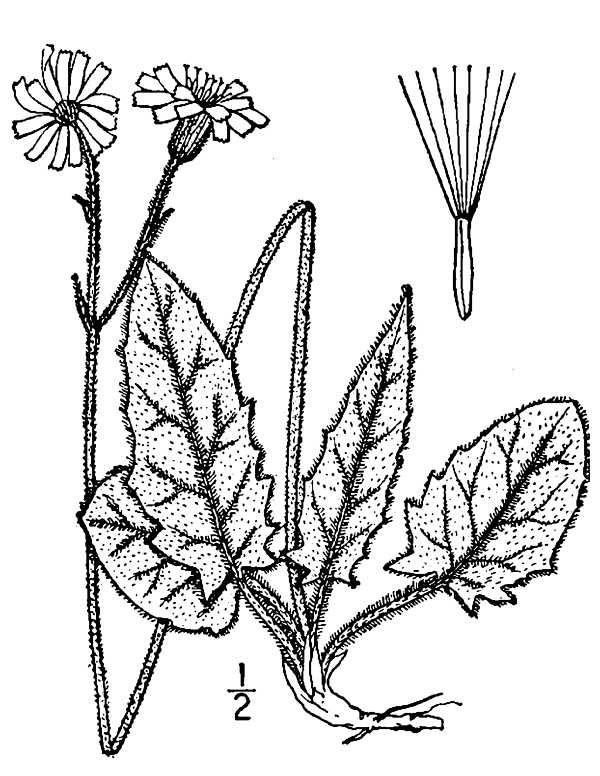
- 1913 drawing

Scientific classification
- Kingdom: Plantae
- Clade: Tracheophytes
- Clade: Angiosperms
- Clade: Eudicots
- Clade: Asterids
- Order: Asterales
- Family: Asteraceae
- Genus: Hieracium
- Species: H. murorum

Binomial name
- Hieracium murorum L. 1753

= Hieracium murorum =

Species of flowering plant

Hieracium murorum, the wall hawkweed, is a species of flowering plant in the family Asteraceae. It is native to Europe and naturalized in some of the colder regions of North America.
