= Vasil Kovachev =

Bulgarian botanist and zoologist

- Born: 1 January 1866; Ruse
- Died: 3 August 1926 (aged 60); Ruse
- Citizenship: Bulgarian
- Education: Novorossiya University of Odesa
- Scientific career
- Fields: botany zoology

Vasil Todorov Kovachev (Bulgarian: Васил Тодоров Ковачев; 1 January 1866 – 3 August 1926) was a Bulgarian zoologist and botanist.

== Biography ==
Vasil Kovachev was born in Ruse on 1 January 1866. He completed his primary and secondary education in his hometown. From 1885 to 1889, Kovachev studied at the Novorossiya University in Odesa, then in the Russian Empire. After graduation, he returned to Bulgaria and started working as a natural history teacher in Veliko Tarnovo. Along with teaching, he collected materials for a natural science collection. In 1891, he moved to Ruse, where he taught at the State Male High School. Kovechev continued to collect materials for a future natural history museum and conducted numerous excursions in the regions of Ruse, Shumen, Varna and Veliko Tarnovo. In 1900, he founded the Natural Research Society in Ruse as a branch of the Bulgarian Natural Research Society.

In 1912, he was invited as an inspector of natural sciences at the Ministry of Public Education. In 1914, he was appointed principal of the High School of Haskovo, and seven months later he was a teacher in Plovdiv. From October 1915 to April 1922, he taught higher pedagogical courses in Kyustendil at invitation of the Ministry of Public Education. From April 1922 to September 1923, he was a fisheries inspector at the Ministry of Agriculture and State Property. He then returned to Ruse, where he worked at a high school until September 1925.

Vasil Kovachev suffered from hereditary syphilis, which began to manifest itself after 1915. He spent his last days wandering the streets of Ruse and was eventually admitted to the Ruse State Hospital by its director, Dr. Hitrov, a student of Vasil Kovachev. He died on 3 August 1926.

He was a member of the Zoological and Botanical Society in Vienna. The botanist Prof. Josef Velenovský named a new species of plant in his honour – Cytisus kovacevii.

== Research ==
Vasil Kovachev wrote his first scientific articles in 1889–1891, two on botany and one on zoology. In the period up to 1911, he published 7 works in the field of botany and 16 works related to zoology. They presented data on the mosses in Bulgaria and contributions to the protection of vascular plants in Ruse Province. After 1905, he stopped publishing works on botany and concentrated solely on zoology. He published numerous works on the mammals, birds, reptiles, amphibians and freshwater fish of Bulgaria.

== Sources ==
- Golemanski, Vasil; Bozhkov, Dimo (1997). Notable Bulgarian Zoologists (in Bulgarian). Prof. Marin Drinov Academic Press. ISBN 954-430-506-8.
