= List of reptiles of Bulgaria =

Topographic map of Bulgaria

Bulgaria is a country in southeastern Europe situated entirely in the Balkan peninsula. The country is inhabited by 39 reptilian species, which makes reptiles the second least diverse class of vertebrates in the country, after Bulgaria's amphibians. The list includes four species that have not been recorded in the country since the first half of the 20th century – the loggerhead sea turtle, green sea turtle, aspic viper and meadow viper. There are four turtle and two tortoise species of four families – Cheloniidae, Emydidae, Geoemydidae and Testudinidae; fifteen lizard species of four families – Anguidae, Gekkonidae, Lacertidae and Scincidae; and eighteen snake species of four families – Boidae, Colubridae, Typhlopidae and Viperidae. In addition, in recent years one turtle species, the North American pond slider, has been observed in numerous bodies of water all over the country; it has not reproduced successfully in the country and is not included in the list. The other two extant orders, Crocodilia and Rhynchocephalia, are not represented in Bulgaria.

The foundations of Bulgarian herpetology, or studies of amphibians and reptiles, were laid in the end of the 19th century by the teacher Vasil Kovachev, who published a number of articles on the subject and the 1912 book Herpetologic Fauna of Bulgaria. In the 1930s and 1940s, the zoologist Ivan Buresh and his associate Yordan Tsonkov conducted in-depth research on the diversity and distribution of the amphibian and reptile species in the country. In the second half of the 20th century the leading Bulgarian herpetologist was Dr. Vladimir Beshkov.

Bulgaria provides various habitats for reptiles. The country falls within six terrestrial ecoregions of the Palearctic realm: Balkan mixed forests, Rodope montane mixed forests, Euxine-Colchic deciduous forests, Aegean and Western Turkey sclerophyllous and mixed forests, East European forest steppe, and Pontic–Caspian steppe. Bulgaria has varied topography. From north to south the main geomorphological regions are the Danubian Plain, the Balkan Mountains, the Sub-Balkan valleys, the Rila–Rhodope massif to the south-west, the Upper Thracian Plain and the Strandzha mountains to the south-east. Most of the country is situated within the humid continental climate region, with Alpine climate in the highest mountains and Mediterranean climate in the southernmost regions. The highest diversity of reptiles is recorded in southernmost Bulgaria – the valley of the river Struma, the eastern Rhodope Mountains, the southern reaches of the river Maritsa and Strandzha. Reptiles are also most diverse at low altitudes; 15 species occur below 200 m (660 ft), and only five species are common above 1,200 m (3,900 ft).

== Status ==
The worldwide (not specific to Bulgaria) conservation status of species is based on their placement in one of the following categories from the IUCN Red List.

EX – Extinct
CR – Critically endangered
NT – Near threatened
DD – Data deficient
NE – Not evaluated

EW – Extinct in the wild
EN – Endangered
VU – Vulnerable
LC – Least concern

Most of the reptile species found in Bulgaria have been categorised as least concern or not evaluated. Four species are near-threatened (the European pond turtle, meadow lizard, four-lined snake and Hermann's tortoise), two species have been designated vulnerable (the meadow viper and spur-thighed tortoise) and two species are classified as endangered (the loggerhead sea turtle and green sea turtle).

== Order Testudines ==
=== Family Cheloniidae ===
Cheloniidae are a family of sea turtles with worldwide distribution in all tropical oceans. The family contains seven species in five genera, of which two species have been recorded in the waters off the Bulgarian Black Sea Coast.

Cheloniidae
Species	Common name	Distribution	Status	Image
Caretta caretta	loggerhead sea turtle	Recorded twice along the Bulgarian Black Sea Coast, off Shabla and Primorsko	EN	A turtle, Caretta caretta
Chelonia mydas	green sea turtle	Recorded only once along the Bulgarian Black Sea Coast, off Sozopol	EN	A turtle, Chelonia mydas

=== Family Emydidae ===
Emydidae, also known as pond or march turtles, are a family of fresh water turtles. With the exception of two species, they are only found in the Western Hemisphere. There are close to 50 species in 10 genera, of which one species occurs in Bulgaria.

Emydidae
Species	Common name	Distribution	Status	Image
Emys orbicularis	European pond turtle	Found in the rivers and lakes all over the country; recorded up to 1,100 m (3,600 ft) altitude on Lozen Mountain	NT	A turtle, Emys orbicularis

=== Family Geoemydidae ===
Geoemydidae are one of the largest and most diverse turtle families. They are distributed in North America, northern South America, Europe, northwestern Africa and Asia. The family contains about 70 species in 19 genera, of which one species occurs in Bulgaria.

Geoemydidae
Species	Common name	Distribution	Status	Image
Mauremys rivulata	Balkan pond turtle	Found in the southernmost regions of the country: the lower course of the rivers Struma, Arda, Maritsa and Tundzha, as well as in the rivers south of the Ropotamo along the Black Sea coast	NE	A turtle, Mauremys rivulata

=== Family Testudinidae ===
Testudinidae, also known as tortoises, are a family of land-dwelling turtles found in North and South America, Europe, Africa and Asia. They are terrestrial and inhabit warm areas ranging from rain forests to deserts. The family contains about 50 species in 11 genera, of which 2 species are found in Bulgaria.

Testudinidae
Species	Common name	Distribution	Status	Image
Testudo graeca	Greek tortoise	Found in the lowlands of the country: the Danube and Upper Thracian Plains, the Black Sea coast and some river valleys	VU	A tortoise, Testudo graeca
Testudo hermanni	Hermann's tortoise	Found in the lowlands of the country: the Danube and Upper Thracian Plains, the Black Sea coast and some river valleys; recorded up to 1,450 m (4,760 ft) altitude in the mountains	NT	A tortoise, Testudo hermanni

== Order Squamata ==
=== Suborder Lacertilia ===
==== Family Anguidae ====
Anguidae are a family of legless lizards distributed in the Northern Hemisphere. The group includes both egg-laying and viviparous species. There are 73 species in 10 genera, of which three species occur in Bulgaria.

Anguidae
Species	Common name	Distribution	Status	Image
Anguis colchica	Eastern slowworm	Found in most regions of the country	NE	A lizard, Anguis colchica
Anguis fragilis	common slowworm	Rhodope Mountains	NE	A lizard, Anguis fragilis
Pseudopus apodus	European legless lizard	Occurs in the lowlands of south-eastern Bulgaria and along the Black Sea coast, with isolated populations in the lower valleys of the rivers Rusenski Lom and Struma	NE	A lizard, Pseudopus apodus

==== Family Gekkonidae ====
Gekkonidae are a large family of small to mid-size geckos. They have global distribution with particular diversity in tropical areas. Gekkonidae include 1033 species in 51 genera, of which two species is found in Bulgaria.

Gekkonidae
Species	Common name	Distribution	Status	Image
Mediodactylus kotschyi	Kotschy's gecko	Found in south-eastern Bulgaria, including the Upper Thracian Plain and the eastern Rhodope Mountains, as well as along the lower Struma valley	LC	A gecko, Cyrtopodion kotschyi
Mediodactylus danilewskii	Mediterranean thin-toed gecko	Found along the Black Sea coast of Bulgaria	NE	A lizard, Mediodactylus danilewskii

==== Family Lacertidae ====
Lacertidae are a family of true lizards or wall lizards native to Europe, Asia and Africa. The European and Mediterranean species inhabit mainly forest and scrub habitats. There are 321 species in 37 genera, of which nine species occur in Bulgaria.

Lacertidae
Species	Common name	Distribution	Status	Image
Darevskia praticola	meadow lizard	Found in most of the country, except for the south-western regions and the Upper Thracian valley	NT	A lizard, Darevskia praticola
Lacerta agilis	sand lizard	Found in Rila, Pirin, western Rhodope Mountains, western and central Balkan Mountains, Sredna Gora and Osogovo, as well as isolated populations in Strandzha and the northern Black Sea coast	LC	A lizard, Lacerta agilis
Lacerta trilineata	Balkan green lizard	Most common in the lowlands of eastern Bulgaria, as well as in the lower Struma valley	LC	A lizard, Lacerta trilineata
Lacerta viridis	European green lizard	Common throughout the country, except for the highest mountains	LC	A lizard, Lacerta viridis
Ophisops elegans	snake-eyed lizard	Inhabits only a small area in the eastern Rhodope Mountains and the lower valley of the Maritsa river	NE	A lizard, Ophisops elegans
Podarcis erhardii	Erhard's wall lizard	Occurs in south-western Bulgaria and the eastern Rhodope Mountains	LC	A lizard, Podarcis erhardii
Podarcis muralis	common wall lizard	Widespread throughout the whole country	LC	A lizard, Podarcis muralis
Podarcis tauricus	Balkan wall lizard	Found in the lowlands of northern and eastern Bulgaria, as well as in the lower Struma valley	LC	A lizard, Podarcis tauricus
Zootoca vivipara	viviparous lizard	Found in Rila, Pirin, Vitosha, the western Rhodope Mountains, the western and central Balkan Mountains and Osogovo	LC	A lizard, Zootoca vivipara

==== Family Scincidae ====
Scincidae are a cosmopolitan family occurring in a variety of habitats worldwide, apart from boreal and polar regions. With 1589 species, of which one is found in Bulgaria, Scincidae are among the most diverse lizard families.

Scincidae
Species	Common name	Distribution	Status	Image
Ablepharus kitaibelii	European copper skink	Found throughout the whole country, except for some areas to the south-west	LC	A lizard, Ablepharus kitaibelii

=== Suborder Serpentes ===
==== Family Boidae ====
Boidae are a family of nonvenomous snakes found in America, Africa, Europe, Asia, and some Pacific Islands. There are 58 species in 8 genera, of which one species occurs in Bulgaria.

Boidae
Species	Common name	Distribution	Status	Image
Eryx jaculus	javelin sand boa	Found in south-eastern Bulgaria, as well as in isolated populations in the lower Struma valley and around Svishtov along the Danube river bank	NE	A snake, Eryx jaculus

==== Family Colubridae ====
Colubridae are a family of snakes with worldwide distribution found on every continent except Antarctica. There are 844 species in 118 genera, of which 12 species occur in Bulgaria.

Colubridae
Species	Common name	Distribution	Status	Image
Coronella austriaca	smooth snake	Found in the whole country, up to 1,600 m (5,200 ft) altitude; rarely recorded up to 2,200 m (7,200 ft)	NE	A snake, Coronella austriaca
Dolichophis caspius	Caspian whipsnake	Inhabits most of the country, except for the high mountains of southwestern Bulgaria	NE	A snake, Dolichophis caspius
Elaphe quatuorlineata	four-lined snake	Found only in the southern Struma valley	NT	A snake, Elaphe quatuorlineata
Elaphe sauromates	blotched snake	Occurs in the Upper Thracian Plain, the Danubian Plain, Dobrudzha and the Black Sea coast	NE	A snake, Elaphe sauromates
Malpolon monspessulanus	Montpellier snake	Found in southern Bulgaria: lower Struma valley, eastern Rhodope Mountains, Dervent Heights and Strandzha	LC	A snake, Malpolon monspessulanus
Natrix natrix	grass snake	Found all over the country	LC	A snake, Natrix natrix
Natrix tessellata	dice snake	Occurs all over the country, up to 1,100 m (3,600 ft) altitude	LC	A snake, Natrix tessellata
Platyceps collaris	red whip snake	Found in several populations along the Black Sea coast to the south of Sozopol	LC	A snake, Platyceps collaris
Platyceps najadum	Dahl's whip snake	Found in south-western Bulgaria, the eastern Rhodope Mountains, the northern foothills of the western Rhodope Mountains and the Dervent Heights	LC	A snake, Platyceps najadum
Telescopus fallax	European cat snake	Found in the southern Struma valley and the eastern Rhodope Mountains	LC	A snake, Telescopus fallax
Zamenis longissimus	Aesculapian snake	Widespread throughout the whole country, up to 1,600 m (5,200 ft) altitude, rarely recorded up to 2,000 m in Belasitsa	LC	A snake, Zamenis longissimus
Zamenis situla	European ratsnake	Found in the southern Struma valley, the foothills of the western Rhodope Mountains and the southern Black Sea coast	LC	A snake, Zamenis situla

==== Family Typhlopidae ====
Typhlopidae are a family of blind snakes found mostly in the tropical regions of Africa, Asia, the Americas, Australia and various islands. There are 381 species in 29 genera, of which one species is native to Bulgaria and Europe.

Typhlopidae
Species	Common name	Distribution	Status	Image
Typhlops vermicularis	European blind snake	Found in southern Bulgaria: lower Struma valley, eastern Rhodope Mountains, Dervent Heights and Strandzha, and the southern Black Sea coast	NE	A blind snake, Typhlops vermicularis

==== Family Viperidae ====
Viperidae are a family of venomous snakes found worldwide, except in Antarctica, Australia, New Zealand, Ireland, Madagascar, Hawaii and various other isolated islands. They include 329 species in 33 genera, of which four species occur in Bulgaria.

Viperidae
Species	Common name	Distribution	Status	Image
Vipera ammodytes	horned viper	Found in the whole country, up to 1,450 m (4,760 ft) altitude	LC	A viper, Vipera ammodytes
Vipera aspis	aspic viper	Only two specimens have been recorded in Bulgaria – one found near Harmanli in 1933, the other in unknown location in the beginning of the 20th century	LC	A viper, Vipera aspis
Vipera berus	common European adder	Occurs in the mountains, at an altitude of 1,000–2,700 m (3,300–8,900 ft) – Rila, Pirin, Vistosha, western Rhodope Mountains, western and central Balkan Mountains, central Sredna Gora and Osogovo	LC	A viper, Vipera berus
Vipera ursinii	meadow viper	Known only from a few specimens found in the Shumen Plateau and on Lyulin Mountain; there were no records since 1934 until in 2003 a specimen was collected in Ludogorets Plateau in northeastern Bulgaria	VU	A viper, Vipera ursinii

== See also ==
- Geography of Bulgaria
- List of amphibians of Bulgaria
- List of birds of Bulgaria
- List of mammals of Bulgaria
- List of protected areas of Bulgaria
