= List of amphibians of Bulgaria =

Topographic map of Bulgaria

Bulgaria is a country in southeastern Europe situated entirely in the Balkan peninsula. Bulgaria is inhabited by 22 autochthonous amphibian species, which makes the amphibians the least diverse class of vertebrates in the country. They include nine species of newts and salamanders from a single family, Salamandridae, as well as 13 frog and toad species from five families—Bombinatoridae, Bufonidae, Hylidae, Pelobatidae and Ranidae. The most recently classified species are the northern crested newt, identified in 2005, and the Macedonian crested newt, identified in 2007. In 2017 genetic studies suggested that the smooth newt was a species complex and was split in six species, of which three are found in Bulgaria—the smooth newt sensu lato, the Greek smooth newt and the Schmidtler's smooth newt. Some of the most common species include the European green toad, yellow-bellied toad, and marsh frog.

The foundations of Bulgarian herpetology (the study of amphibians and reptiles) were laid in the end of the 19th century by the teacher Vasil Kovachev, who published a number of articles on the subject and the 1912 book Herpetologic Fauna of Bulgaria. In the 1930s and 1940s zoologist Ivan Buresh and his associate Yordan Tsonkov conducted in-depth research on the diversity and distribution of the amphibian and reptile species in the country. In the second half of the 20th century the leading Bulgarian herpetologist was Dr. Vladimir Beshkov.

Bulgaria provides various habitats for amphibians. The country falls within six terrestrial ecoregions of the Palearctic realm: Balkan mixed forests, Rodope montane mixed forests, Euxine-Colchic deciduous forests, Aegean and Western Turkey sclerophyllous and mixed forests, East European forest steppe and Pontic–Caspian steppe. Bulgaria has varied topography. From north to south the main geomorphological regions are the Danubian Plain, the Balkan Mountains, the Sub-Balkan valleys, the Rila–Rhodope massif to the south-west, the Upper Thracian Plain and the Strandzha mountains to the south-east. The country has a dense network of rivers but with the notable exception of the Danube, they are mostly short and with low water flow. The average annual precipitation is 670 mm; the rainfall is lower in the lowlands and higher in the mountains. The driest region is Dobrudzha in the north-eastern part of the Danubian Plain (450 mm), while the highest rainfall has been measured in the upper valley of the river Ogosta in the western Balkan Mountains (2293 mm).

== List of species ==
=== Order Caudata ===
==== Family Salamandridae ====
Salamandridae, or true salamanders, are a family of terrestrial and aquatic salamanders, mostly distributed in Asia and Europe, although some species are found in North Africa and North America. Most species have slightly toxic skin secretions and many develop dorsal body and tail fins when they return to an aquatic stage. There are 109 species in 21 genera; of these, nine species in four genera are found in Bulgaria.

Salamandridae
Species	Common name	Distribution	Status	Image
Lissotriton graecus	Greek smooth newt	Sandanski–Petrich Valley and Belastisa mountain, south-westernmost Bulgaria	NE	
Lissotriton schmidtleri	Schmidtler's smooth newt	Found in south-eastern Bulgaria, up to 1500 m altitude	NE	
Lissotriton vulgaris	smooth newt	Found in the whole country, up to 1500 m altitude; a 2017 study determined that the smooth newt was a species complex and was split in six species; the smooth newt sensu lato inhabits the north and west of the country	LC	
Mesotriton alpestris	Alpine newt	Most common in the Rila and western Rhodope Mountains; isolated populations in the western Balkan Mountains, central Sredna Gora and Osogovo	LC	
Salamandra salamandra	fire salamander	Moist wooded areas in the mountains, mostly absent from the Danubian Plain and the Upper Thracian Plain	LC	
Triturus cristatus	northern crested newt	First discovered in Bulgaria in 2005; found in the western Balkan Mountains near Vratsa which is its southernmost locality worldwide	LC	
Triturus dobrogicus	Danube crested newt	Occurs in the Danube river and the lower course of its tributaries	NT	
Triturus ivanbureschi	Balkan-Anatolian crested newt	Common in the country up to 1500 m altitude; absent from the Danube river and the lower course of its tributaries	NE	
Triturus macedonicus	Macedonian crested newt	Slavyanka mountain in south-western Bulgaria	NE	

=== Order Anura ===
==== Family Bombinatoridae ====
Bombinatoridae are an Old World toad family often referred to as fire-bellied toads because of their brightly coloured ventral sides which demonstrate their high toxicity. It includes ten species in two genera, Barbourula and Bombina, both of which have flattened bodies, of which two species from genus Bombina occur in Bulgaria.

Bombinatoridae
Species	Common name	Distribution	Status	Image
Bombina bombina	European fire-bellied toad	Found in the lowlands of the country, up to 250 m altitude: the Danube and Upper Thracian Plains and the Black Sea Coast	LC	
Bombina variegata	yellow-bellied toad	Common species in the lower mountains, up to 2000 m altitude (in Pirin and the Balkan Mountains)	LC	

==== Family Bufonidae ====
Bufonidae are a family of toads native to every continent except Australia and Antarctica. Bufonidae include the typical toads with shortened forelimbs, hindlimbs used for walking or hopping, dry warty skin, and parotoid glands behind eyes. The family contains 590 species in 50 genera, of which 2 species from genus Bufo are found in Bulgaria.

Bufonidae
Species	Common name	Distribution	Status	Image
Bufo bufo	common toad	Found all over the country, up to 1300 m altitude, with the exception of Pirin, where it has been recorded at 1960 m	LC	
Bufotes viridis	European green toad	Found all over the country, up to 1200 m altitude; recorded in Rila at an altitude of 2000 m	LC	

==== Family Hylidae ====
Hylidae or tree frogs are the most diverse amphibian family with 951 species in 51 genera, and worldwide distribution. Most species inhabit tropical areas with warm and humid climate, especially the Neotropics. Hylids range from small to large in size and usually have distinct adhesive toe discs that contain a cartilage offsetting the terminal phalanx, which aids in climbing. The only genus found in Europe is Hyla, with 6 species out of 37 worldwide, and one in Bulgaria.

Hylidae
Species	Common name	Distribution	Status	Image
Hyla arborea	European tree frog	Found all over the country, up to 1300 m altitude; recorded in Rila at an altitude of 2300 m	LC	

==== Family Pelobatidae ====
Pelobatidae, also known as spadefoot toads, are a small family of frogs with one genus and four species spread in Europe, Western Asia and North-western Africa. They have short legs, stocky bodies with vertical pupils and produce an odour similar to garlic, hence their name in Bulgarian is чесновица (chesnovica), 'garlic toad'. Two of the four species inhabit the country.

Pelobatidae
Species	Common name	Distribution	Status	Image
Pelobates fuscus	common spadefoot	Found in the areas along the Danube river, the northernmost Black Sea coast, as well as in isolated populations in Sofia Valley	LC	
Pelobates syriacus	eastern spadefoot toad	Found in the areas along the Danube river, the whole Black Sea coast, the Upper Thracian Plain and the southern Struma valley	LC	

==== Family Ranidae ====
Ranidae are a widespread family also known as true frogs. They have generalized frog body plans and a generalized aquatic tadpole stage. The family includes 379 species in 14 genera, of which six species in two genera occur in Bulgaria.

Ranidae
Species	Common name	Distribution	Status	Image
Pelophylax lessonae	pool frog	Westernmost areas along the Bulgarian Danube bank	LC	
Pelophylax ridibundus	marsh frog	Found all over the country, up to 1300 m altitude; recorded in Belasitsa at an altitude of 2000 m	LC	
Rana dalmatina	agile frog	Found all over the country, up to 1200 m altitude, with singular records up to 2000 m	LC	
Rana graeca	Greek stream frog	Occurs in south-western Bulgaria	LC	
Rana temporaria	common frog	Found mostly in the mountains, between 1000 and 2000 m altitude: Balkan Mountains, Rila, Pirin, Vitosha, Osogovo, Rhodope Mountains	LC	

== See also ==
- Geography of Bulgaria
- List of birds of Bulgaria
- List of mammals of Bulgaria
- List of reptiles of Bulgaria
- List of protected areas of Bulgaria

== Footnotes ==
=== Notes ===
a: Conservation status at a world level (not exclusive to Bulgaria) of the species according to the IUCN Red List: Conservation status - IUCN Red List of Threatened Species:

EX - Extinct, EW - Extinct in the wild
CR - Critically endangered, EN - Endangered, VU - Vulnerable
NT - Near threatened, LC - Least concern
DD - Data deficient, NE - Not evaluated
