= Stob =

Stob may refer to:

== People ==
- Ralph Stob (1894–1965), U.S. academic, president (1933–1939) of Calvin College
- Verity Stob (since 1988), pseudonymous author of IT satirical articles

== Places ==
- Stob (village), part of Bulgaria's municipality of Kocherinovo
- Stob, Domžale, Slovenia, a former village now part of Domžale
- Stob Earth Pyramids, in Bulgaria's Kyustendil Province
- Stob, Scottish prefix for "Mount", as in Stob Binnein, Stob Coire Sgreamhach, Stob Ghabhar, etc.
- Stobs Military Camp just outside Hawick Scotland
