= Zhabokryak Raid =

- Part of Bulgarian resistance movement during World War II
Location	Bulgaria

Belligerents
Rila-Pirin detachment	Nazi Germany

Strength
350 men	Unknown (Assumed 27)

Casualties and losses
2 wounded	26 killed 1 captured

The Zhabokryak Raid was an operation carried out by the Rila-Pirin partisan detachment during the Bulgarian resistance movement during World War II.

== Course of action ==
The raid was organized under the People's Liberation Insurgent Army and simultaneously targeted four government objectives that stretched 20 kilometers along the Rilska River. For the operation, the Rilo-Pirinskov partisan squad of 350 combatants was gathered.

During the operation, the partisan corps attacked a Bulgarian watchpost. In the village of Pastra, a reserve company was taken without a fight by the partisans and their weapons were taken as trophies. In the locality of Zhabokryak, there were reports of workshops and warehouses being plundered. Numerous cases of material damage were caused by partisans in the area.

The building of a joint Bulgarian–German command company (nicknamed "Granitoid") was taken over. At the start of the operation, two partisan combatants were wounded. On the other side, 25 German soldiers and their leader, Reinhart Tomanek, were killed. One German officer survived by hiding throughout the battle.

== Assessment of the raid ==
There are conflicting accounts of the goals of the raid in publicized written sources from that time.
