= Ribni Lakes =

Glacial lakes in Bulgaria

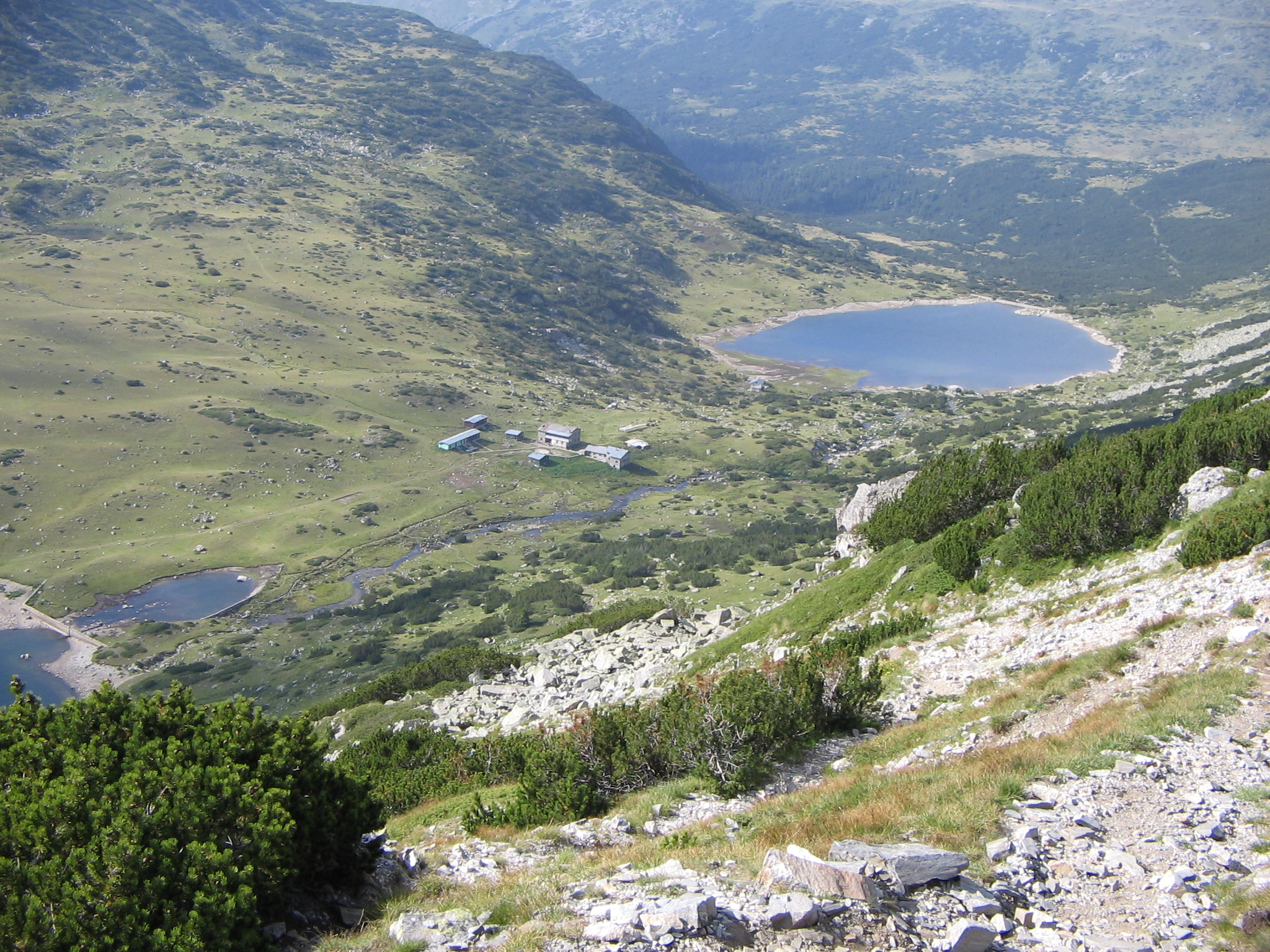

- Location within Bulgaria
- Coordinates: 42°6′24″N 23°29′29″E
- Basin countries: Bulgaria
- Surface elevation: 2,227 m (7,306 ft) to 2,200 m (7,200 ft)

Ribni Lakes (Bulgarian: Рибни езера, meaning Fish Lakes) are a group of two larger and several smaller non-permanent glacial lakes situated in the central part of the Rila mountain range in southwestern Bulgaria. They are located in a deep cirque widely opened to the north between the summits of Kyoravitsa (2,612 m) to the west, Kanarata (2,667 m) to the south and Yosifitsa (2,697 m) to the northeast. They are located in the eastern reaches of the Rila Monastery Nature Park.

The Upper Ribno Lake is situated at an altitude of 2,227 m some 1.5 km north of the summit of Kanarata. It has an oblong shape in direction south–southwest to north–northeast, with a length of 800 m, a width of 300 m and area of 176,000–180,000 m^{2}. Its maximum depth is 9 m. The total volume is 771,000 m^{3}. The lake is fed by about 30 small streams. A concrete spillway was built in its northeastern shore.

The Lower Ribno Lake is at an altitude of 2,200 m some 400 m north of the uppers lake. It is smaller, with an oval shape, a length of 340 m, a width of 230 m, an area of 47,000 m^{2} and a depth of 9 m. The total volume is 131,700 m^{3}.

The lakes form the headwaters of the Rilska River, a left tributary of the Struma. Due to their permanent flow, the lakes, along with others nearby, such as the Smradlivo Lake, are important for feeding the river during the period of low water ensuring the functioning of ecosystems in the area. They have a significant and constant water outflow of 14.5 million m^{3} per year, which represents 6% of the entire discharge of the Rilska River.

The chemical composition of the water in the lakes has low mineralization of 58.8 mg/L; the hydrocarbonate ions are about 30 mg/L. The water is very soft and highly oxygenated — about 10 mg/L. The chemical composition is favourable for populations of river trout, after which the lakes were named.

The lakes serve as a leveler of the small Rila Hydropower Cascade. Between them is constructed the homonymous Ribni Lakes Refuge with 181 beds, which is a starting point for trails to the Rila Monastery.
