= Porominovo =

Porominovo Пороминово
- Village
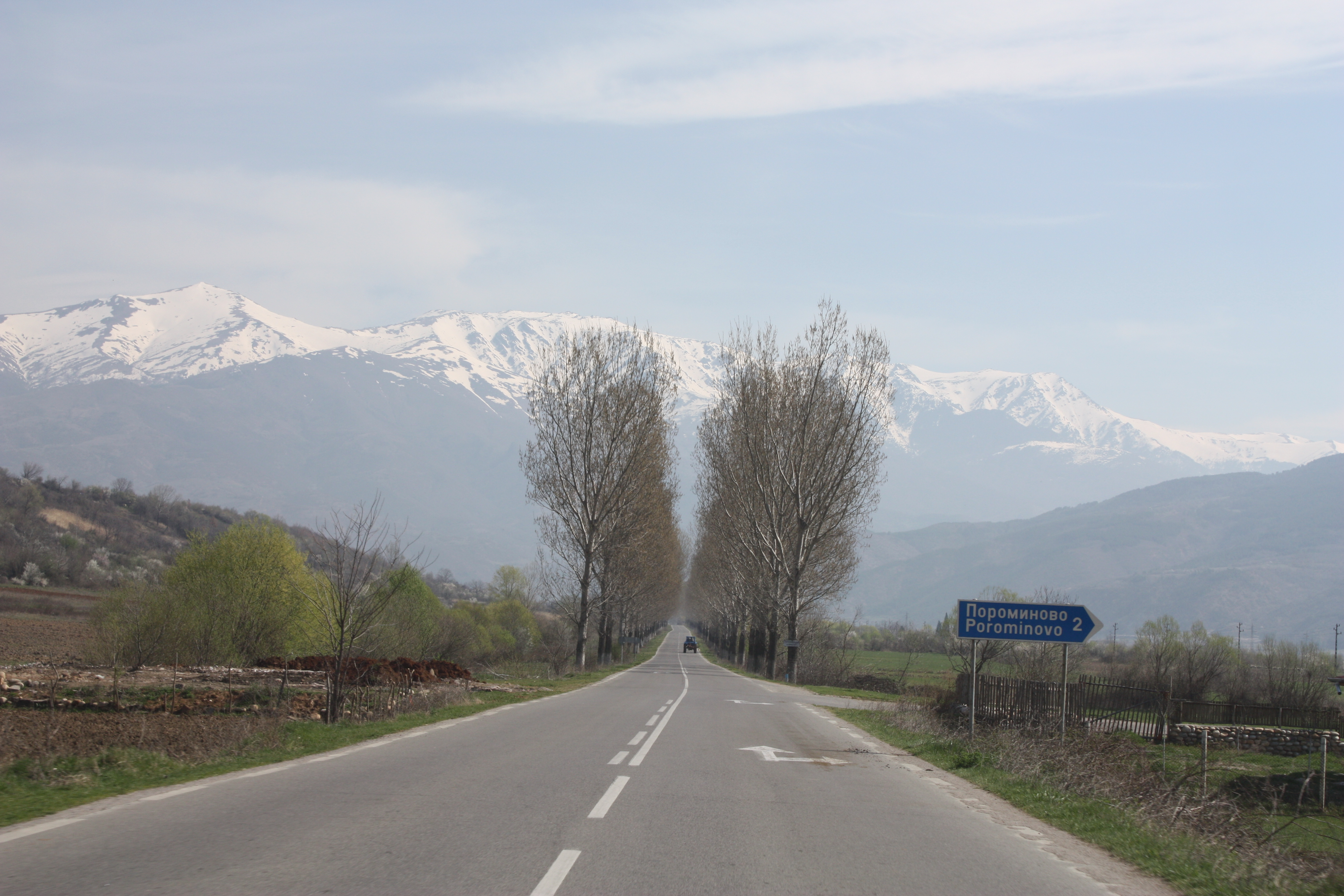

- Location within Bulgaria
- Coordinates: 42°4′N 23°5′E
- Country: Bulgaria
- Province: Kyustendil Province
- Municipality: Kocherinovo

Area
  - Total: 13.432 km^{2} (5.186 sq mi)
- Elevation: 426 m (1,398 ft)

Population (2013)
  - Total: 453
- Time zone: UTC+2 (EET)
  - Summer (DST): UTC+3 (EEST)
- Postal code: 2639

Porominovo (Bulgarian: Пороминово) is a village in Kocherinovo Municipality, Kyustendil Province, south-western Bulgaria. As of 2013 it has 453 inhabitants. It is situated at the western foothills of the Rila Mountains on the banks of the Rilska River in the vicinity of the Stob Earth Pyramids.
