= Rilets =

Bulgarian mountain peak

Rilets (Рилец)
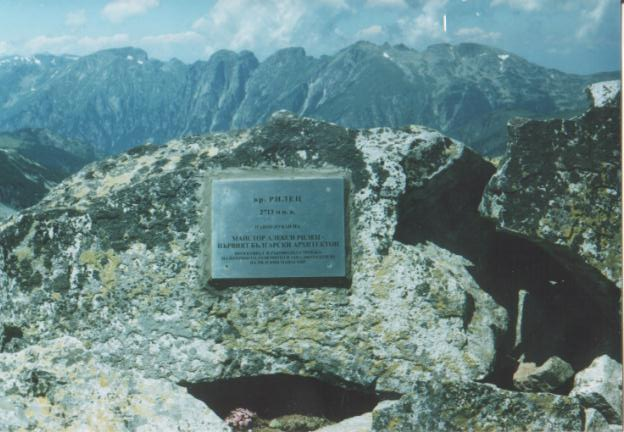

Highest point
- Elevation: 2,713 m (8,901 ft)
- Coordinates: 42°6′56.52″N 23°27′42.12″E

Geography
- Location: Bulgaria
- Parent range: Rila Mountains

Rilets (Bulgarian: Рилец) is a summit in the northwestern part of the Rila mountain range in southwestern Bulgaria reaching height of 2,713 m. It is named after the 19th-century Bulgarian architect Aleksi Rilets. It is located in Rila Monastery Nature Park, where it is the highest peak.

The summit is the highest point of a short, difficult to access secondary ridge that branches off north of the Rilets ridge, one of the two main ridges of Central Rila. Rilets is a bare, rocky peak resembling a huge granite pyramid. A large part of the summit, as well as the crest of the secondary ridge, is covered with huge and unstable boulders. The area around the summit is difficult to navigate, with extensive sections of rock debris alternating with belts of impenetrable dwarf mountain pine (Pinus mugo). Ascent in winter is difficulty category and requires alpine tools.

Rilets is part of the watershed ridge between the rivers Rilska and Iliyna. In a cirque on its eastern slope is situated Smradlivo Lake, the largest glacial lake in Bulgaria and the Balkan Peninsula. At its southwestern foot are the Devil's Lakes. The ridge to the north of the summit bisects and on a terrace enclosed by the two secondary ridges is located the Black Lake. In the north, the slopes of the Rilets reach the valley of the Rilska River.

From the summit there are impressive views of the Malyovitsa section of Northwestern Rila. The nearest mountain refuge is Ribni Ezera at altitude of 2,230 m.
