= Smradlivo Lake =

Lake in Bulgaria

Smradlivoto Lake
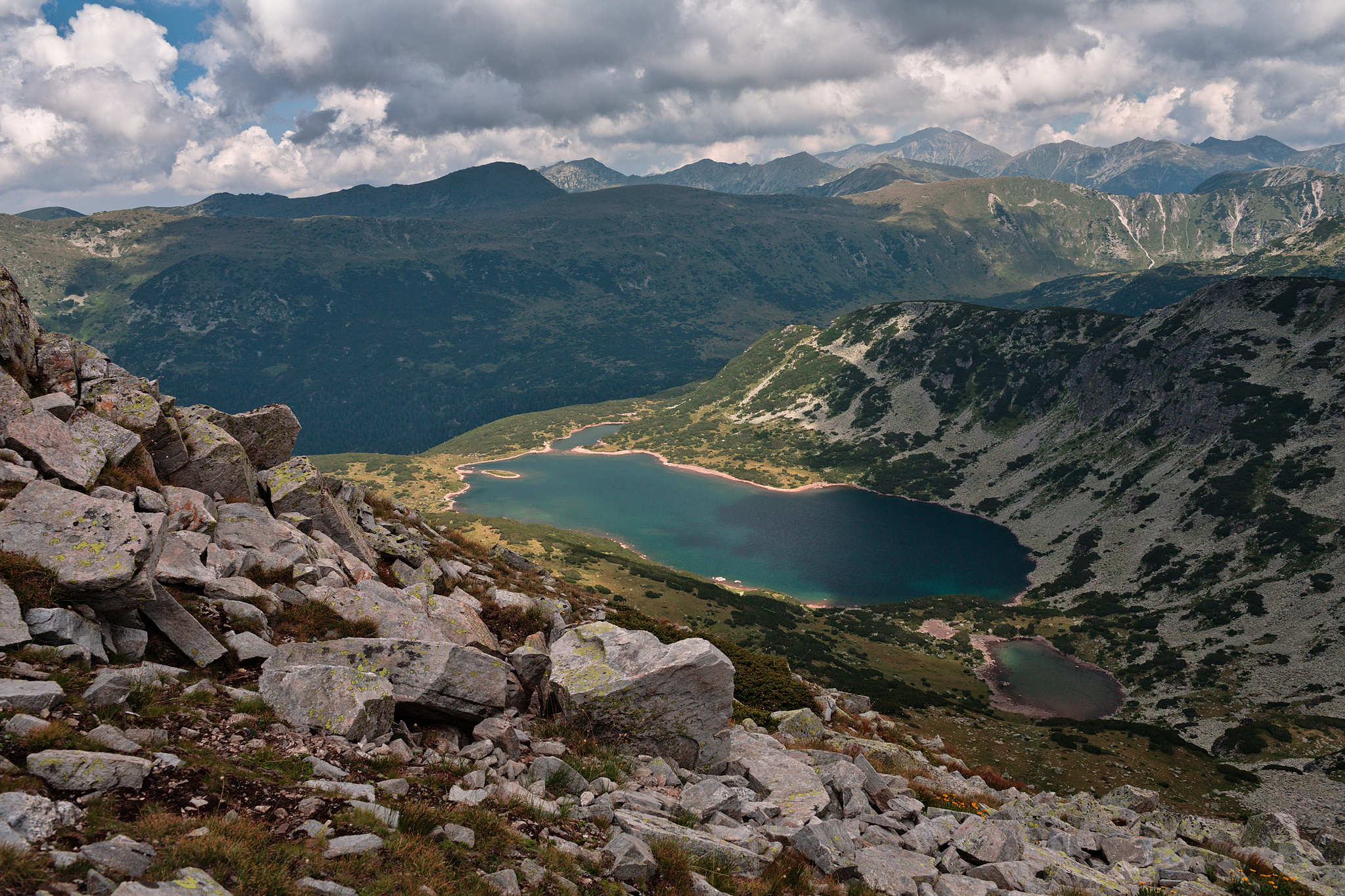

- Location within Bulgaria
- Coordinates: 42°07′15″N 23°28′28″E
- Primary inflows: precipitation
- Catchment area: Rilska River
- Basin countries: Bulgaria
- Max. length: 900 m (3,000 ft)
- Max. width: 260 m (850 ft)
- Surface area: 212,000 m^{2} (2,280,000 sq ft)
- Max. depth: 24 m (79 ft)
- Water volume: 1.72×10^{6} m^{3} (1,390 acre⋅ft)
- Surface elevation: 2,298 m (7,539 ft)

The Smradlivo Lake (Bulgarian: Смрадливото езеро [smrɐdˈlivoto ˈɛzɛro]) is a glacial lake located in the central section of the Rila mountain range, south-western Bulgaria. It is the second of the five Smradlivi Lakes and is situated at an altitude of 2,298 m in a hanging valley facing the valley of the Rilska River to the north between the summits of Rilets (2,713 m) to the south-west and Kyoravitsa (2,612 m) to the south. It falls within the boundaries of the Rila Monastery Nature Park.

The Smradlivoto Lake is oval shaped with a maximum length of 900 m the width of 260 m. With a surface area of 212,000 m^{2} (21.2 ha) it is the largest glacial lake in Bulgaria and second largest in the Balkan Peninsula after the Black Lake in Montenegro. Its depth reaches 24 m; the volume is around 1,720,000 m^{3}. Its outflow is at the northern end, forming a stream that flows into the Rilska River, a left tributary of the Struma, after 1.2 km. Along its northern shore there is a small dyke to regulate the outflow to the small Rilska cascade. The waters of the Smradlivo Lake have low hardness, high content of oxygen and low oxidisability. It sustains populations of brown trout and due to its remoteness there are brown bears, chamois and red deer roaming the forests in the vicinity of the lake.

Its Bulgarian name literally means 'the stinking lake'. Many legends about the lake are linked with the 10th-century medieval Bulgarian hermit and saint John of Rila who found refuge in the nearby valleys and established the Rila Monastery.
