= Karlanovo =

- Village
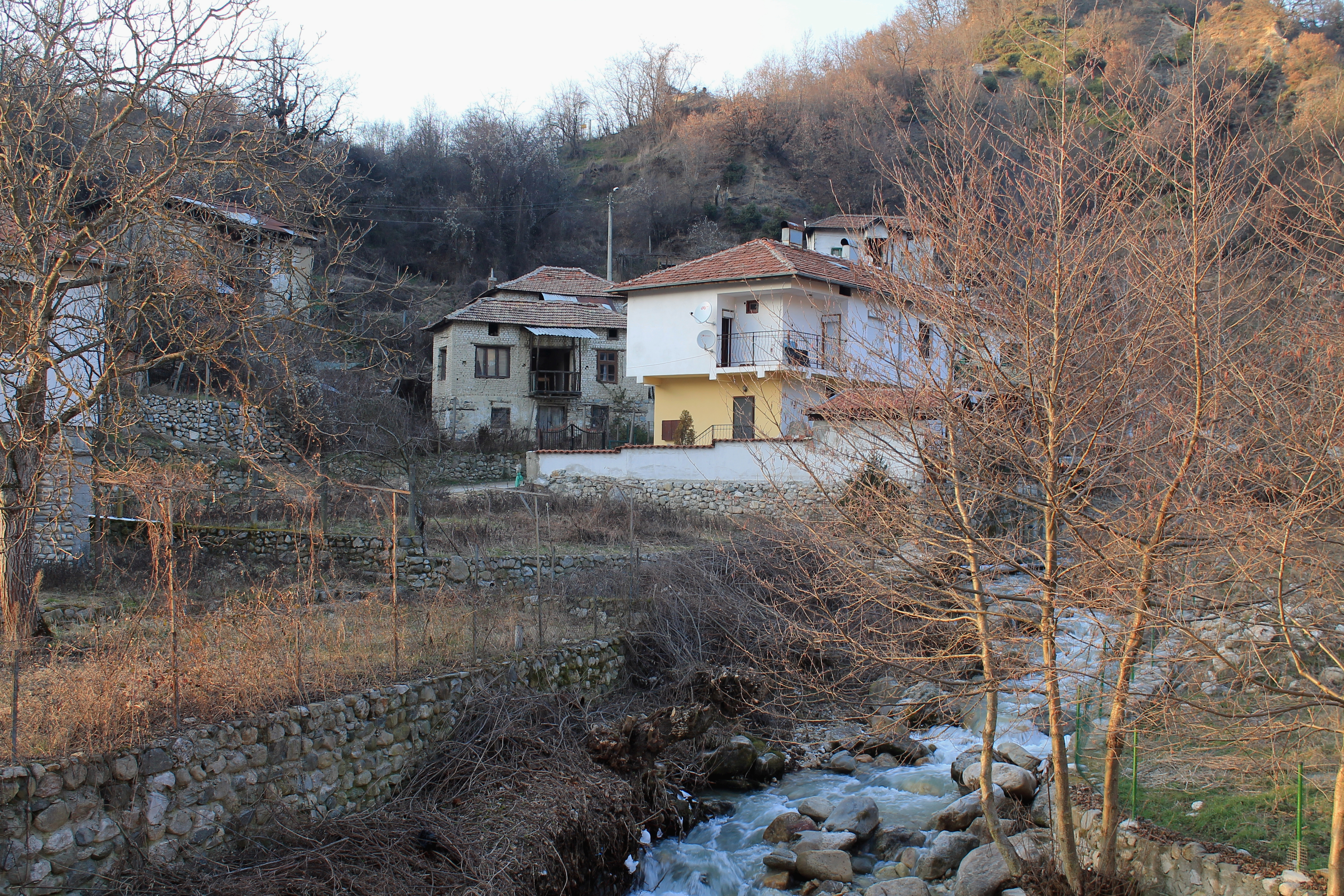

- Location in Bulgaria
- Coordinates: 41°32′40″N 23°24′00″E
- Country: Bulgaria
- Province: Blagoevgrad Province
- Municipality: Sandanski
- Time zone: UTC+2 (EET)
  - Summer (DST): UTC+3 (EEST)

Karlanovo (Bulgarian: Кърланово) is a village in the municipality of Sandanski, in Blagoevgrad Province, Bulgaria. It is situated at the south-western foothills of the Pirin mountain range and is nestled within the Melnik Earth Pyramids.
