= Gorna Sushitsa =

- Village
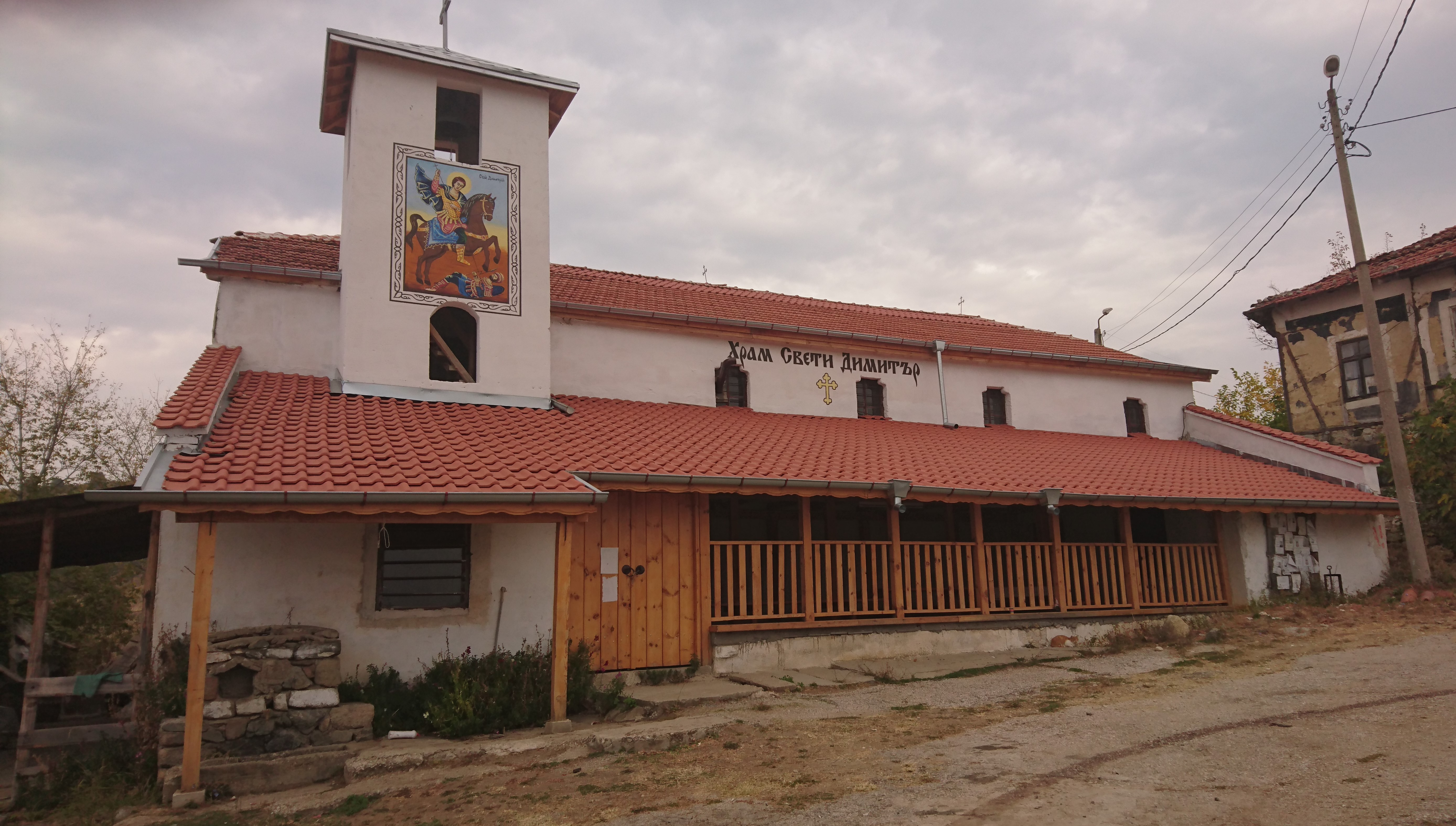

- Location within Bulgaria
- Coordinates: 41°33′N 23°23′E
- Country: Bulgaria
- Province: Blagoevgrad Province
- Municipality: Sandanski Municipality
- Time zone: UTC+2 (EET)
  - Summer (DST): UTC+3 (EEST)

Gorna Sushitsa is a village in Sandanski Municipality, in Blagoevgrad Province, Bulgaria. It is situated at the south-western foothills of the Pirin mountain range and is nestled in the Melnik Earth Pyramids.
