= Melnik Earth Pyramids =

Geological formation in southwestern Bulgaria

- Stratigraphic range: Neogene, Quaternary 3 Ma
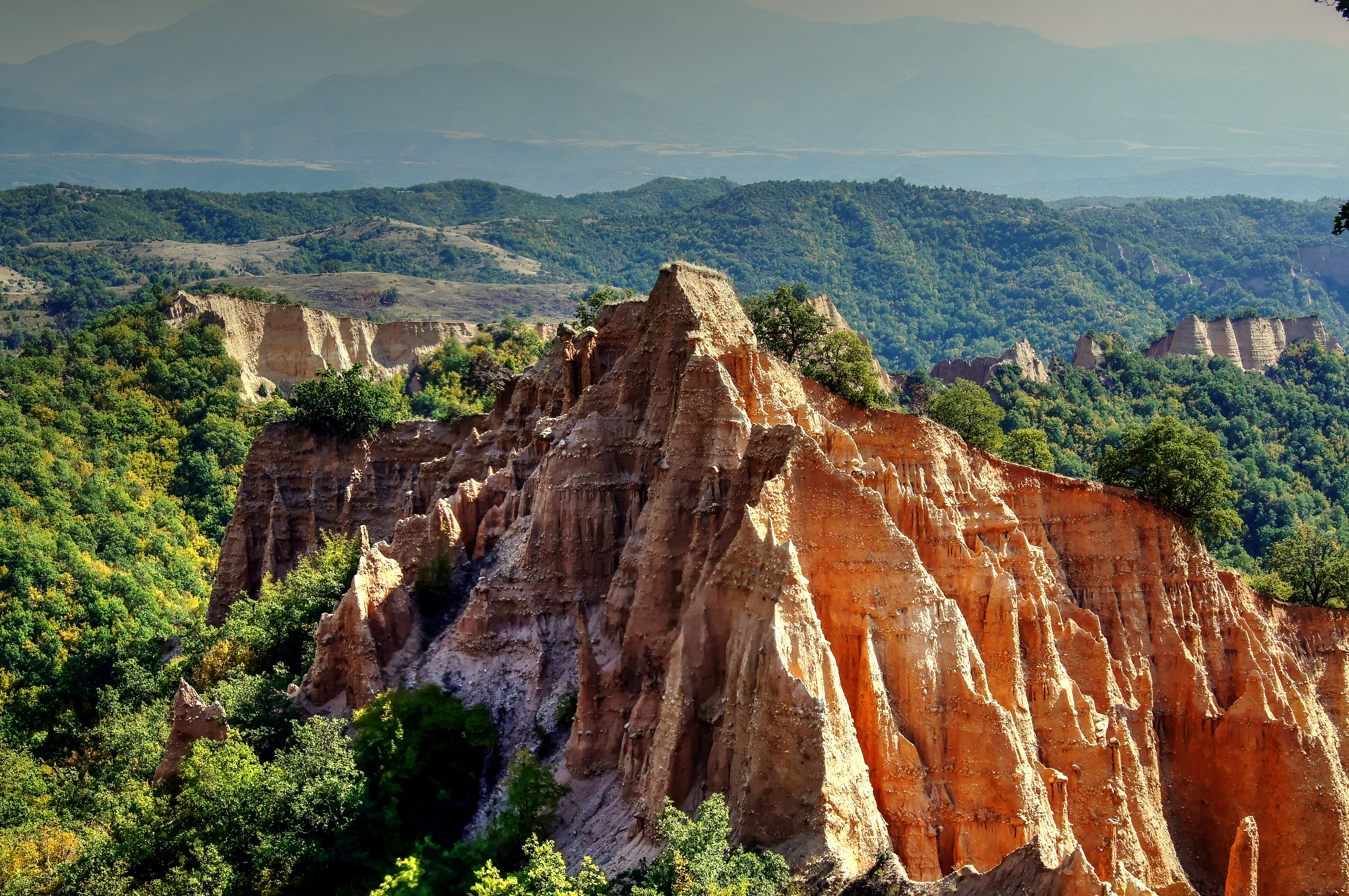
- A view of the Melnik Earth Pyramids
- Type: Geological unit
- Unit of: Pirin
- Area: 17 km^{2}

Lithology
- Primary: Sandstone, conglomerate

Location
- Coordinates: 41°31′32″N 23°23′41″E
- Region: Blagoevgrad Province
- Country: Bulgaria

Type section
- Named for: Melnik

The Melnik Earth Pyramids (Bulgarian: Мелнишки пирамиди) are rock formations, known as hoodoos, situated at the foothills of the Pirin mountain range in south-western Bulgaria. They span an area of 17 km^{2} near the town of Melnik, Blagoevgrad Province. Reaching a height of up to 100 m these sandstone pyramids are shaped in forms, resembling giant mushrooms, ancient towers and obelisks. They were formed primarily due to erosion from rainfall and bedrock wear. The Melnik Earth Pyramids are a geological phenomenon of global importance and were declared a natural landmark in 1960. The rock formations are home to rich flora and fauna heavily influenced by the Mediterranean climate. They are a tourist destination due to the natural environment of the area, the cultural sights of Melnik and the Rozhen Monastery.

== Location ==
The Melnik Earth Pyramids are located at the south-western foothills of the Pirin mountain range in the Balkan Peninsula facing the Sandanski-Petrich Valley at an altitude between 350 and 850 m. They are part of the valley of the Melnishka River, a left tributary of the Struma. Administratively, they are situated on the lands of Bulgaria's smallest town Melnik and the villages of Karlanovo, Rozhen and Gorna Sushitsa, all of them in Sandanski Municipality, Blagoevgrad Province. The rock formations are located at some 180 km south of the national capital Sofia and 65 km south of the regional centre Blagoevgrad.

== Geology and Formation ==
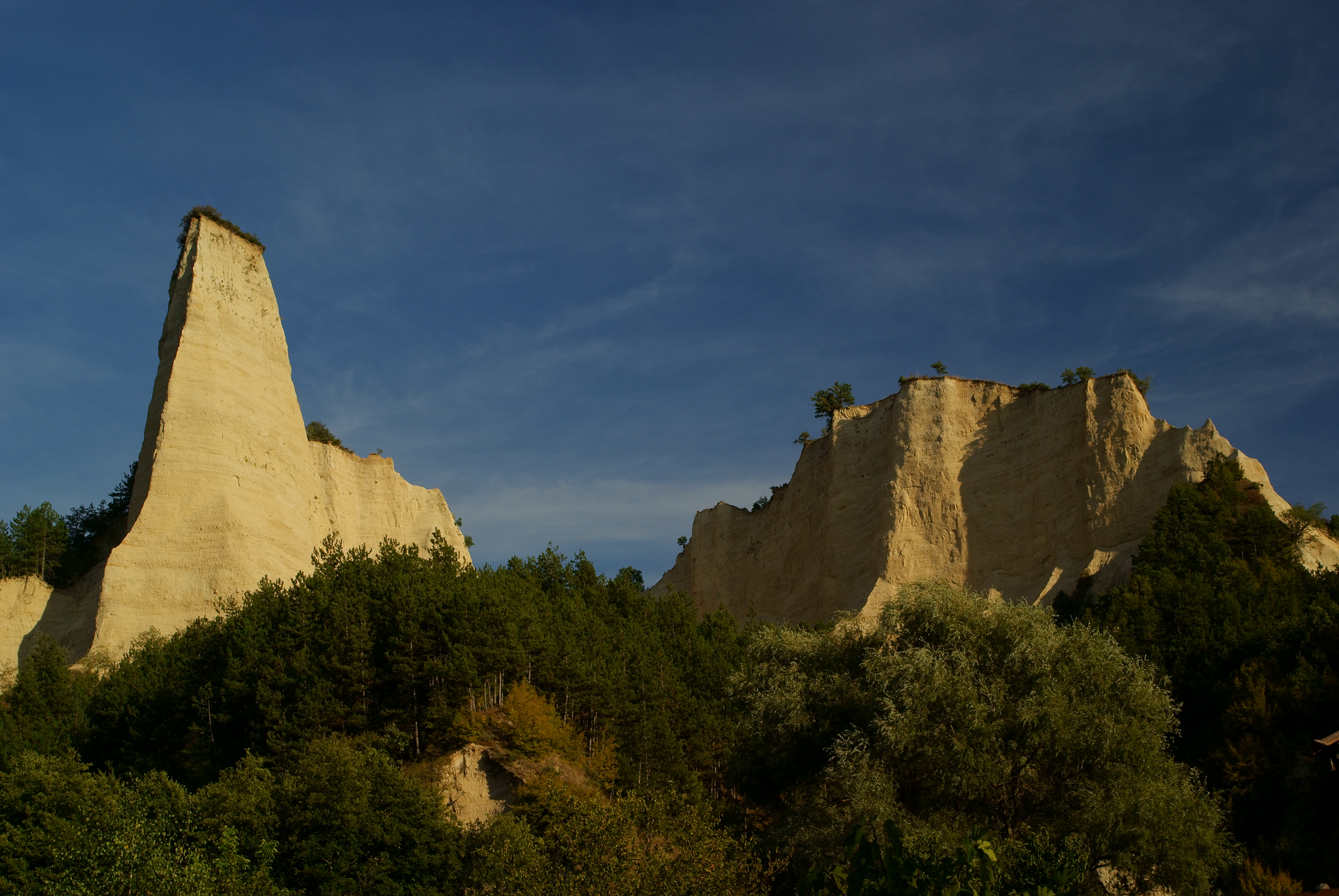
A view of the earth pyramids

Geologically, the earth pyramids are part of the Sandanski or Struma Graben, built up by Neogene deposits bordering the older rocks of the Pirin Horst. They fall within the Melnik Fault that divides the Kalimantsi Formation conglomerate from the Sandanski Formation sandstone. The Melnik Earth Pyramids lie over Precambrian metamorphic rocks and Paleozoic granites. The Sandanski Formation includes some 830 and 1,550 m deep grey and white sandstones, aleurolites and conglomerates that formed during the Miocene 11 to 7 million years ago. The Kalimantsi Formation is divided into a lower layer dominated by sandstone and an upper one dominated by conglomerate with a total depth of 600 m, formed 6 to 2 million years ago. In its upper layer there are remains of late Miocene fauna, such as ancient horses of the species Hipparion mathewi and elephant-like mammals Anancus arvernensis.

The pyramids are built up by sedimentary rocks dated from the Neogene and Quaternary periods. The sediments were deposited 5 to 3 million years ago when the graben valley surrounded by the mountain ranges of Pirin, Belasitsa, Ograzhden and Maleshevo used to be a lake. The lower Neogene layer is over 100 m deep and is composed by lightly soldered grey to yellowish sands and gravels made up mainly of quartz grains and clay strata. The 100 m deep Quaternary layer above forms most of the pyramids and is composed by lightly soldered or unsoldered rust and reddish conglomerate. That colour is due to the iron hydroxides produced by the decomposition of minerals.

The principle factors for the formation of the Melnik Earth Pyramids are the suitable sedimentary rocks and erosion due to rainfall and bedrock wear from the Melnishka River and its tributaries, and to lesser extend – wind abrasion. The lightly soldered sandstone and conglomerate is easily penetrated by rain drops or washed away by the rivers, especially during the snow melting period in Pirin. On the other hand, the clays in the uppermost sections harden as a result of multiple wetting and sun burning and form a 1–2 cm thick layer that significantly delays the washout. There are also processes of secondary pyramid-forming.

== Description ==
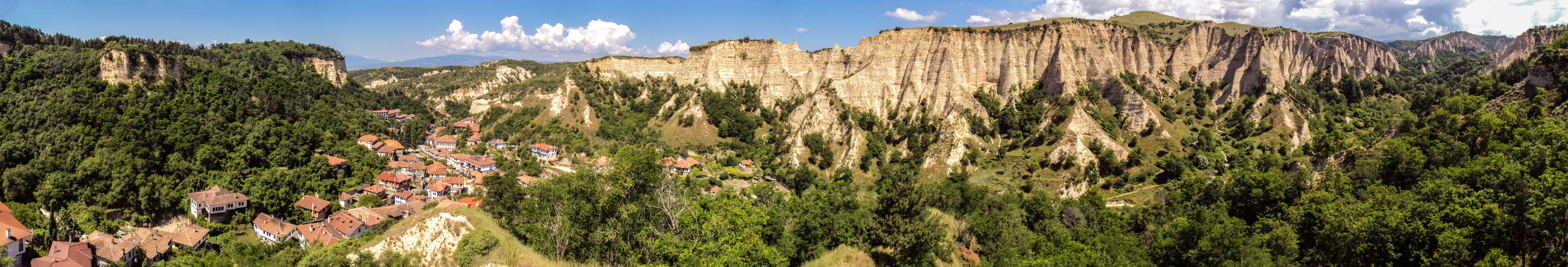
Panorama of the Melnik Earth Pyramids

The combination of light Neogene sandstone and red Quaternary conglomerates creates not only pleasing yellowish and reddish colour gamut, but also determines the extremely diverse forms of the pyramids. They are shaped in a diverse variety of forms, resembling pyramids, cones, giant mushrooms, ancient towers and obelisks spanning a territory of 17 km^{2}. The landscape includes both deep river valleys at the bottom of the site and spacious meadows in the highest sections. The Melnik Earth Pyramids reach a height of up to 100 m near Karlanovo, where the oldest Neogene formations are situated. To the south of Rozhen there are sand chimneys crowned by rock pieces. Near Melnik they form the distinctive backdrop of the town.

== Environment ==
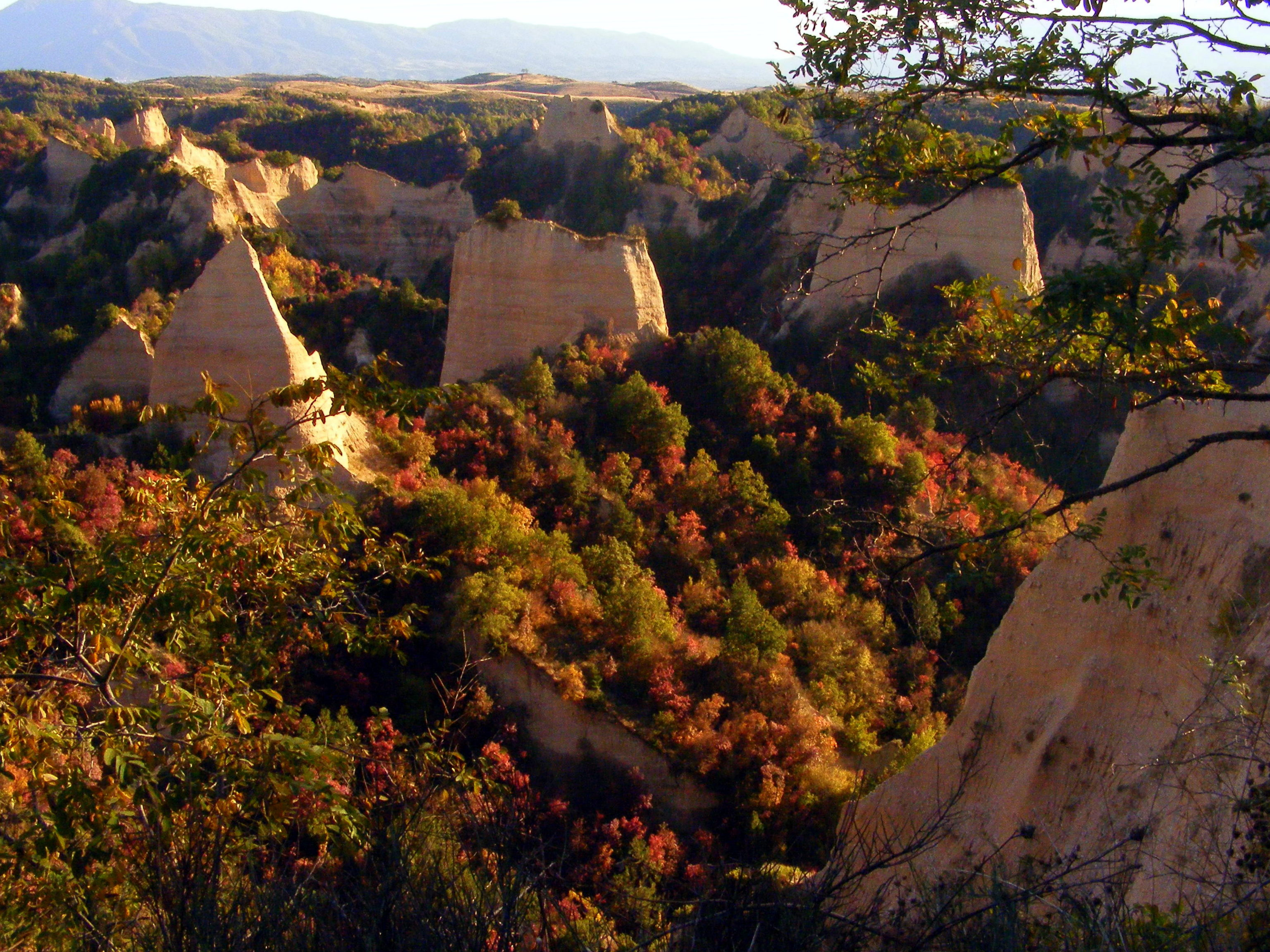
An autumn view

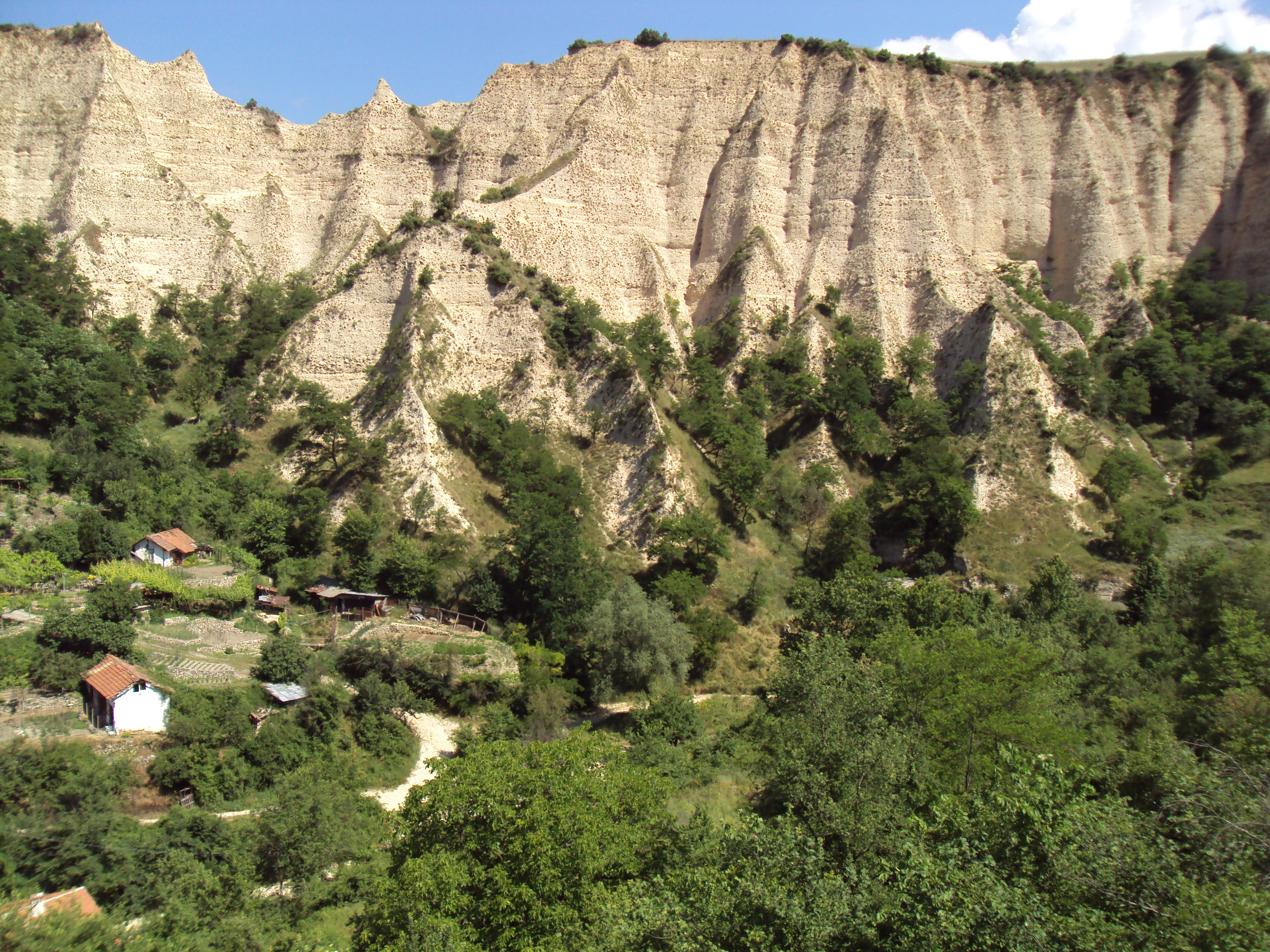
The pyramids near Melnik

The area of the Melnik Earth Pyramids is covered in lush vegetation and is heavily influenced by Mediterranean climate. There are diverse habitats. Most of site is pasture-ground but there are also deciduous forests of pubescent oak (Quercus pubescens), Hungarian oak (Quercus frainetto), Austrian oak (Quercus cerris) and Oriental hornbeam (Carpinus orientalis). The latter is the predominant species, often forming woods in association with Mediterranean shrubs, such as prickly juniper (Juniperus oxycedrus). There are also small forests of kermes oak (Quercus coccifera), as well as ever-green shrub habitats of green olive tree (Phillyrea latifolia).

About 113 bird species have been identifies from the Melnik Earth Pyramids and they have been declared a site of ornithologic importance. There are five species with high conservation value for the Mediterranean biome, whose range in Europe is limited to its south-eastern or southern parts – black-headed bunting, eastern black-eared wheatear, olive-tree warbler, eastern subalpine warbler and Sardinian warbler. The rock formations host of the most important populations of calandra lark in Bulgaria and the European Union, and maintains populations of national significance of European honey buzzard, long-legged buzzard, greater short-toed lark, woodlark, barred warbler, red-backed shrike and common rock thrush. The use of traditional vine growing methods creates favourable conditions for species such as the ortolan bunting and the tawny pipit.

The Melnik Earth Pyramids were declared a natural landmark in 1960 with a total extension of the protected area of 1165.6 hectares, or 11.656 km^{2}.

== Tourism ==
The Melnik Earth Pyramids are a year-round tourist destination. They are accessible via the Sofia–Kulata railway with the next station Damjanitsa about 12 km off and the Struma motorway, part of European route E79, along the Struma valley that links the capital Sofia and Kulata at the border with Greece. The 13 km long third class III-109 road links Melnik to the motorway at the village of Novo Delchevo. The Struma motorway is complete until Kresna, the 25 km gap through the Kresna Gorge until Simitli, where it continues towards Sofia, is closed by the first class I-1 road.

Other than the landforms themselves, the town of Melnik has been designated an architectural reserve and is among the 100 Tourist Sites of Bulgaria with well preserved national revival houses, several churches and ruins of a medieval fortress. The town is also a centre of red wine production with numerous cellars dug in the sandstones and vineyards. Rozhen Monastery, the largest one in the region, was established in the early 13th century during the Second Bulgarian Empire, and is nestled among the earth pyramids a few kilometres to the north-east of Melnik. Next to the monastery, the Church of Saints Cyril and Methodius houses the tomb of the Bulgarian revolutionary Yane Sandanski.

== See also ==
- List of rock formations in Bulgaria
- Geography of Bulgaria
- Stob Earth Pyramids
- Pirin
