= Stob (village) =

Stob Стоб
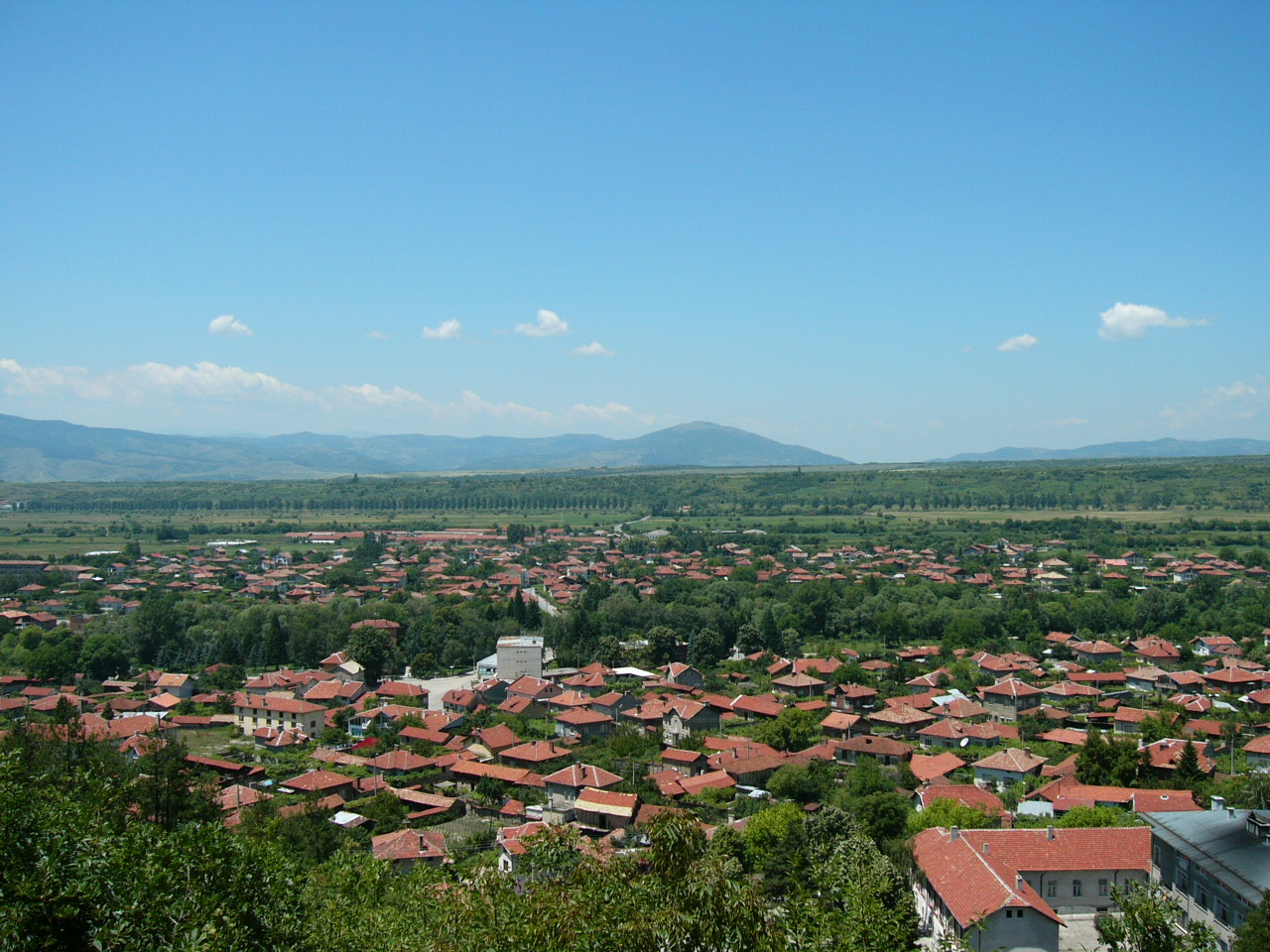
- Overview of Stob

- Stob
- Coordinates: 42°05′43″N 23°06′16″E
- Country: Bulgaria
- Province (Oblast): Kyustendil

Government
  - Mayor: Georgi Stavrev (independent)

Area
  - Total: 20,323 km^{2} (7,847 sq mi)
- Elevation: 449–505 m (1,473–1,657 ft)

Population (2021)
  - Total: 633
- Time zone: UTC+2 (EET)
  - Summer (DST): UTC+3 (EEST)
- Postal Code: 2638
- Area code: 07058

Stob (Bulgarian: Стоб) is a village in southwest Bulgaria, administratively part of Kocherinovo Municipality, Kyustendil Province. Located at the foot of the Rila mountain range and not far from the Rila Monastery, Stob was first mentioned in the 7th century and has been in continuous or near-continuous existence since then. The village is notable for the Stob Pyramids, a natural rock phenomenon in the vicinity of the village.

== History and etymology ==
The village's name first appears in sources in a 7th-century Medieval Greek text as Στοβων (Stovon). It was also mentioned in a charter of Byzantine Emperor Basil II from 1019 after the conquest of the First Bulgarian Empire. The first reference in Old Bulgarian dates to 1378, when it appears in the Rila Charter of Bulgarian Emperor Ivan Shishman as the "town of Stob" (ГРАДЪ СТѠБЪ). The charter emphasizes the Rila Monastery's independence from nearby Stob, among other privileges, and notes that the monastery's lands and properties bordered the town.

A hagiography of Saint John of Rila from the 15th century refers to the village uniquely as Stog (СТОГЬ). However, a chronicle of Serbian monarchs from the 15th–16th century reiterates the name Stob, as does an Ottoman source from 1570. An Ottoman document from 1576 spells the name as Istob and Istub.

The name Stob is thought to derive from the Proto-Indo-European root *sto-bh-:*stei- ("to stand"), as retained in the Bulgarian word стобор stobor ("fence") and akin to words meaning "pole, pillar" in other Slavic languages (cf. Bulgarian стълб stalb). The etymology may reflect the features of the surrounding terrain. The erroneous listing Stog is possibly explained by a false etymology linking the name to the presumably more popular term стог stog ("haystack"), from the related Proto-Indo-European *stogh-.

== Geography ==
The village is located 88 km (55 mi) south-southwest from the capital Sofia, 66 km (41 mi) southeast from the capital of Kyustendil Province, Kyustendil, and 14 km (8.7 mi) north of Blagoevgrad. Easily accessible from the capital, Stob can be reached via Struma Motorway, part of European route E 79, taking the Blagoevgrad/Kocherinovo/Rila/Rilski manastir exit and following the road to the town of Rila and the Rila Monastery.

Nestled at the foot of the highest mountain in Bulgaria, Rila, Stob lies between the small towns of Rila and Kocherinovo and is traversed by the Rilska River.

The village's feast day is 17 July.

== Culture ==
=== Stob Earth Pyramids ===
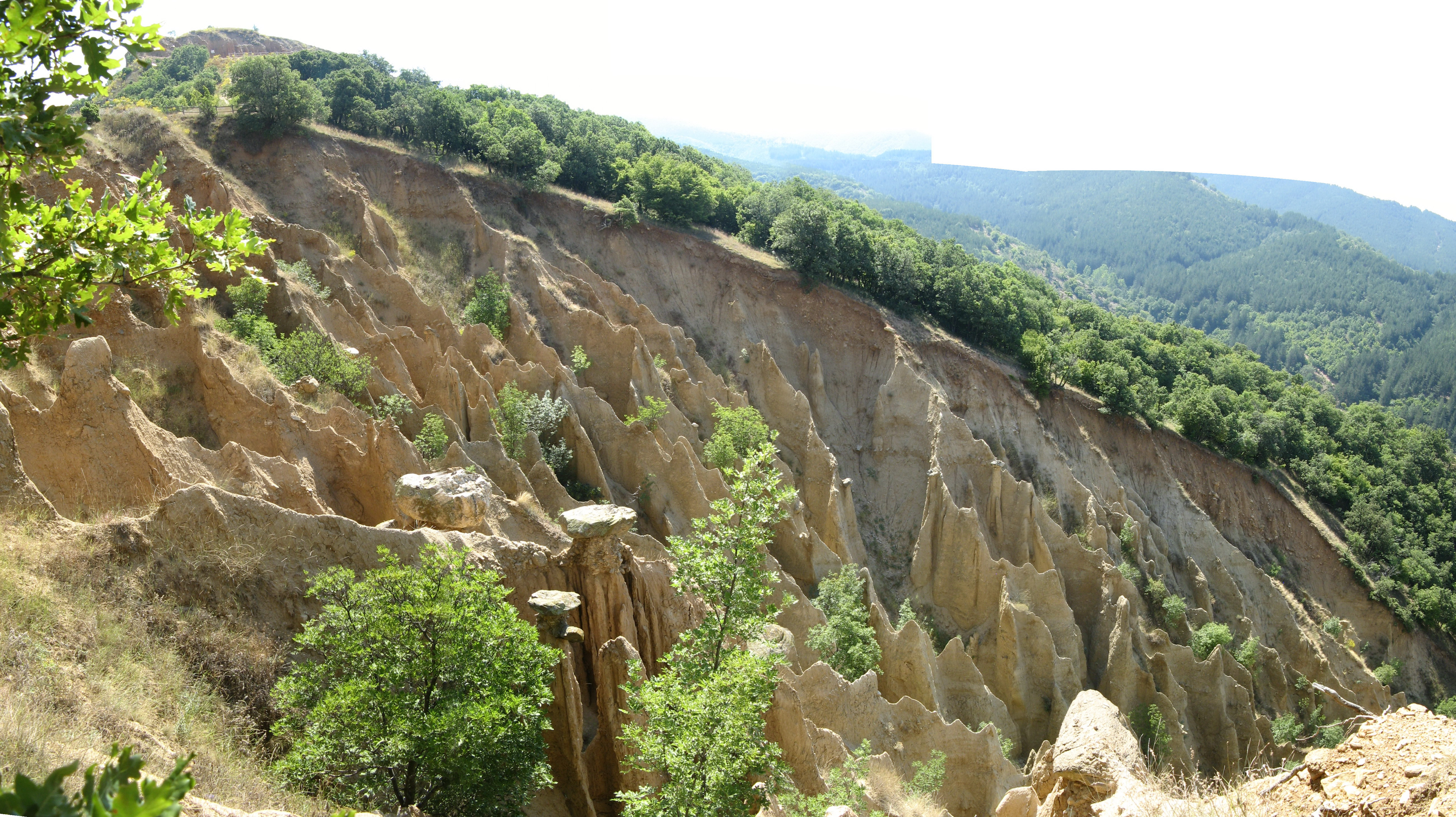
The Stob Pyramids

The Stob Pyramids are a natural rock phenomenon (a set of earth pyramids) located 7 km (4.3 mi) to the northeast of the village. They have been under state protection since 1964 as a natural landmark encompassing 74,000 m^{2} (800,000 sq ft). Shaped by natural erosion, the pyramids range of up to 12 m (39 ft) in height and around 40 m (1,600 in) in thickness at the base. They vary in shape from sharp spires, through conical to mushroom-like formations, some of them topped by flat stones. Groups of individual pyramids have been paired up and given names such as the Bride, the Matchmakers, the Towers, the Pinnacles, and the Samodiva Chimneys.

Different local legends pertaining to the pyramids and the origin of their formation have been passed through generations for centuries. All legends are linked to doomed love.

=== St Procopius Orthodox Church and medieval St Procopius Orthodox Church ruins ===
The medieval church "St. Prokopius" ruins are located about 1 km east of the village in an area called "Church" (Bulgarian: Църквище, romanized: Tsŭrkvishte).The original church dates back to 1373/1393 as evidenced by an extant stone with an engraving of the year on its surface. It is believed the church was destroyed while Bulgaria was under the rule of the Ottoman Empire. After securing official permission from the sultan, the acting church was built on the premises of the village in 1860 by the villagers themselves. Many of the stones from the original establishment were transported and used for the construction. A stone cross with both years of construction 1860 and 1373 is embedded on the northern outer wall of the new church. This is reportedly the only Eastern Orthodox church in Bulgaria dedicated to St Procopius. It is said that the first child baptised in the new church lived to be a centenarian.
