= Stob Earth Pyramids =

- Stratigraphic range: Neogene, Quaternary 2-1 Ma
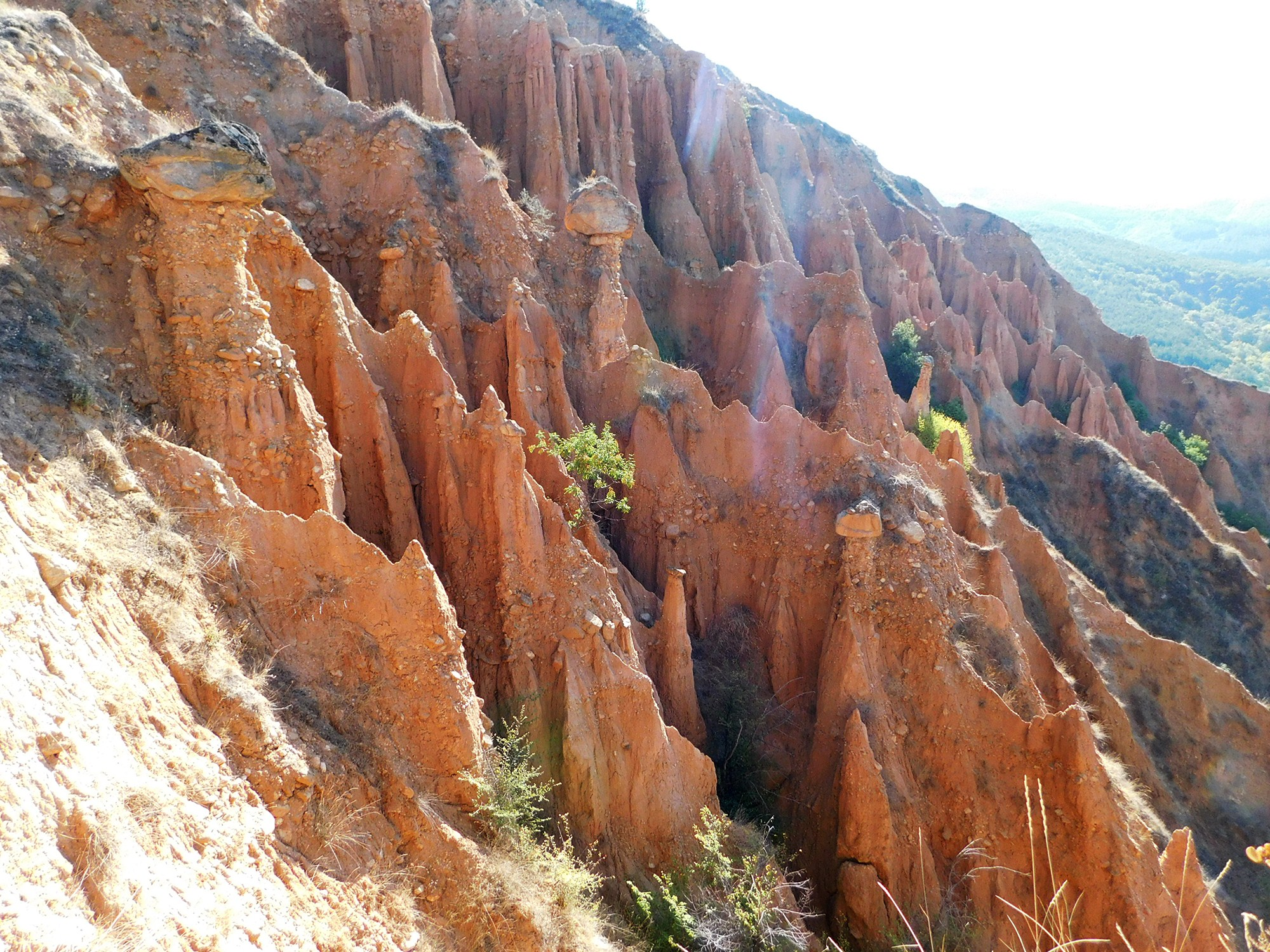
- A view of the Stob Earth Pyramids
- Type: Geological unit
- Unit of: Rila
- Area: 0,74 km^{2}

Lithology
- Primary: Sandstone, conglomerate

Location
- Coordinates: 42.092301°N 23.121123°E
- Region: Kyustendil Province
- Country: Bulgaria

Type section
- Named for: Stob

The Stob Earth Pyramids (Bulgarian: Стобски пирамиди) are rock formations, known as hoodoos, situated at the foothills of the Rila mountain range in south-western Bulgaria. They span an area of 0.7 km^{2} near the village of Stob, Kyustendil Province. The rock formations are up to 12 m high and up to 40 m thick at the base. Their shape is mostly conical to mushroomlike. Some of the columns are topped by flat stones.

== Location ==
The Stob Earth Pyramids are located at the western foothills of the Rila mountain range in the Balkan Peninsula at an altitude between 600 and 750 m. They occupy the Klisura ridge facing the valley of the Rilska River, a left tributary of the Struma. They are situated at less than one kilometre east of the village of Stob in Kocherinovo Municipality, Kyustendil Province. They lie some 83 km south of the national capital Sofia and 18 km north of the city of Blagoevgrad.

== Geology and formation ==
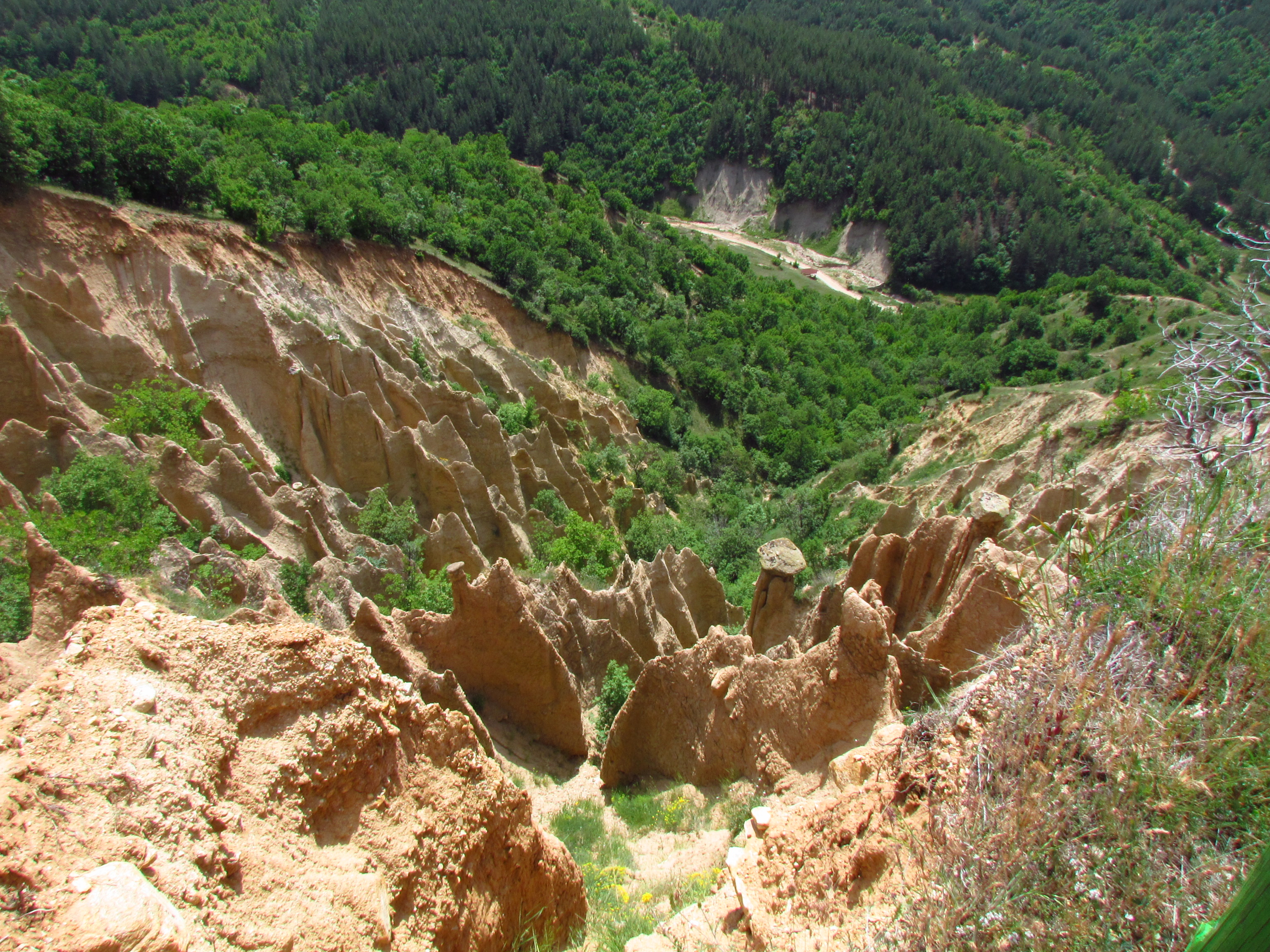
A view from above

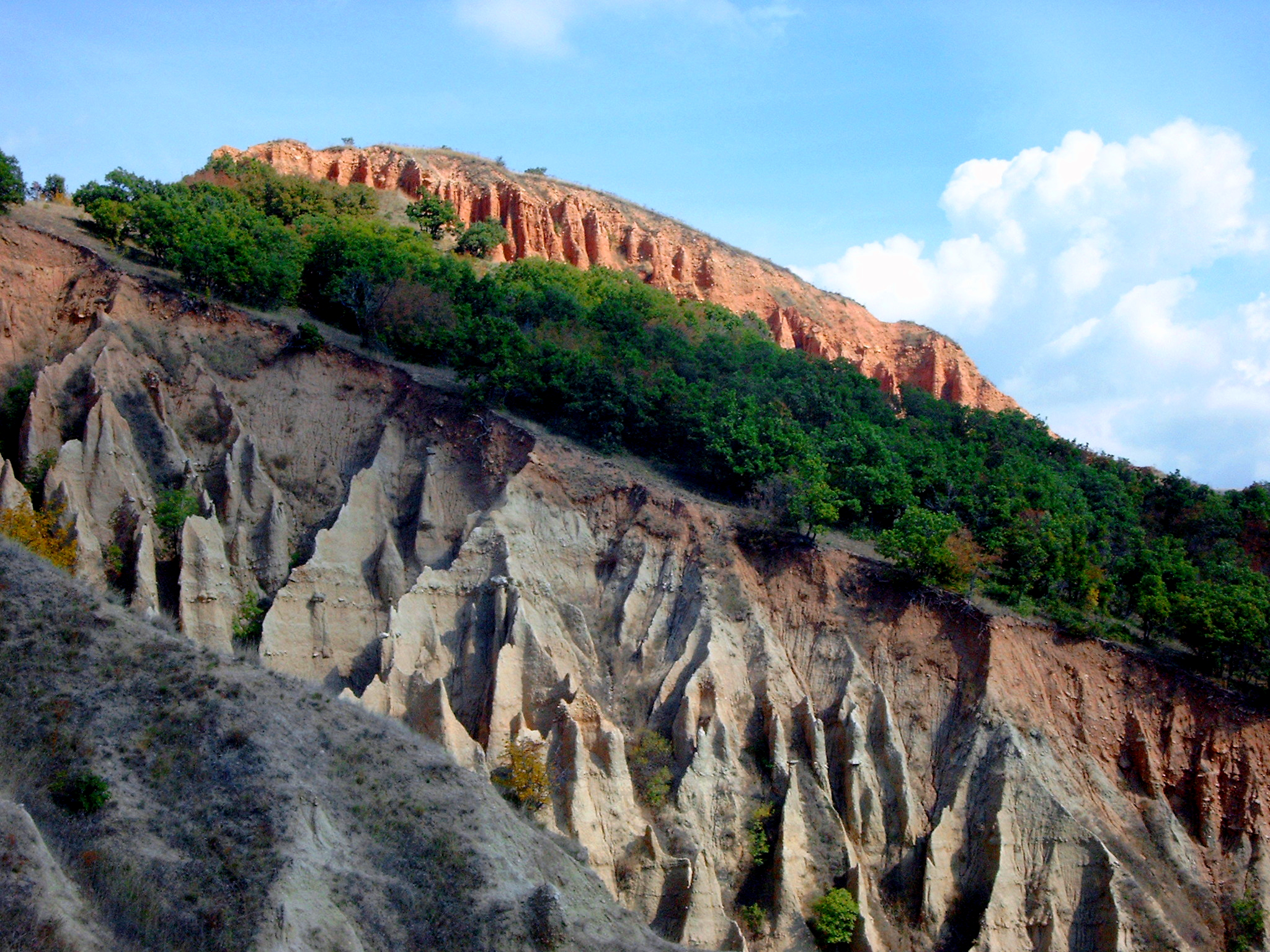
A view of the pyramids

Geologically, the Stob Earth Pyramids are part of the Blagoevgrad Graben that consists of lakebed, alluvial and sloping deposits dated from the Pliocene and Pleistocene epochs. They are built up by Precambrian metamorphic rocks. There are two geological formations: the Dzherman Formation consists of aleurolite, clay and sandstone; the Barakovo one is built up by conglomerate and sandstone.

During the Pliocene the area was at the bottom of a shallow lake and accumulated sediments that form a 200 and 250 m thick stratum consisting of little fragments with a lot of clay. The colour is dull white to yellowing. It forms the foundations of the pyramids but the erosion reveals only small patches this layer. The Pleistocene stratum above is reddish with alternating layers of cobble conglomerate and lightly soldered sandstone, as well as larger rock pieces originating from the slopes of Rila.

The principal factor for the formation of the Stob Earth Pyramids is erosion due to rainfall. The rain drops penetrate the lightly soldered sediment and continuously wash it away. The location of the rock pieces in the stratum determines the place, size and shape of each pyramid because they prevent the abrasion of the layers below. They are covered by a 1 cm thick coat of hardened sun burned clay which protects the fragile sandstone and delays the erosion.

== Description ==
The Stob Earth Pyramids vary in shape from sharp through conical to mushroomlike. About half of the formations are crowned by rocks, whose area is sometimes two to three times larger than the cross-section of the pyramid below. Their height averages some 6 to 10 m but can reach up to 12 m; the thickness at the base is up to 40 m. Most of them are facing in southern direction but there are also a few grouped together on the northern slopes of the ridge overlooking Stob. Groups of individual Pyramids have been named the Towers, the Brothers, the Hammers, the Wedding Couple, the Pinnacles, the Samodiva Chimneys, etc.

They are a tourist destination, although not as popular as the much larger Melnik Earth Pyramids. The rock formations are easily accessible via the Struma motorway and the parallel first class I-1 road that form part of European route E79 along the Struma valley. The third class III-107 branches from I-1 at the municipal centre Kocherinovo and heads for 7 km to north-east to Stob.

The Stob Earth Pyramids were declared a natural landmark in 1964 with a total extension of the protected area of 7.4 hectares, or 0.74 km^{2}.

== See also ==
- List of rock formations in Bulgaria
- Geography of Bulgaria
- Melnik Earth Pyramids
- Rila
