= Rilska River =

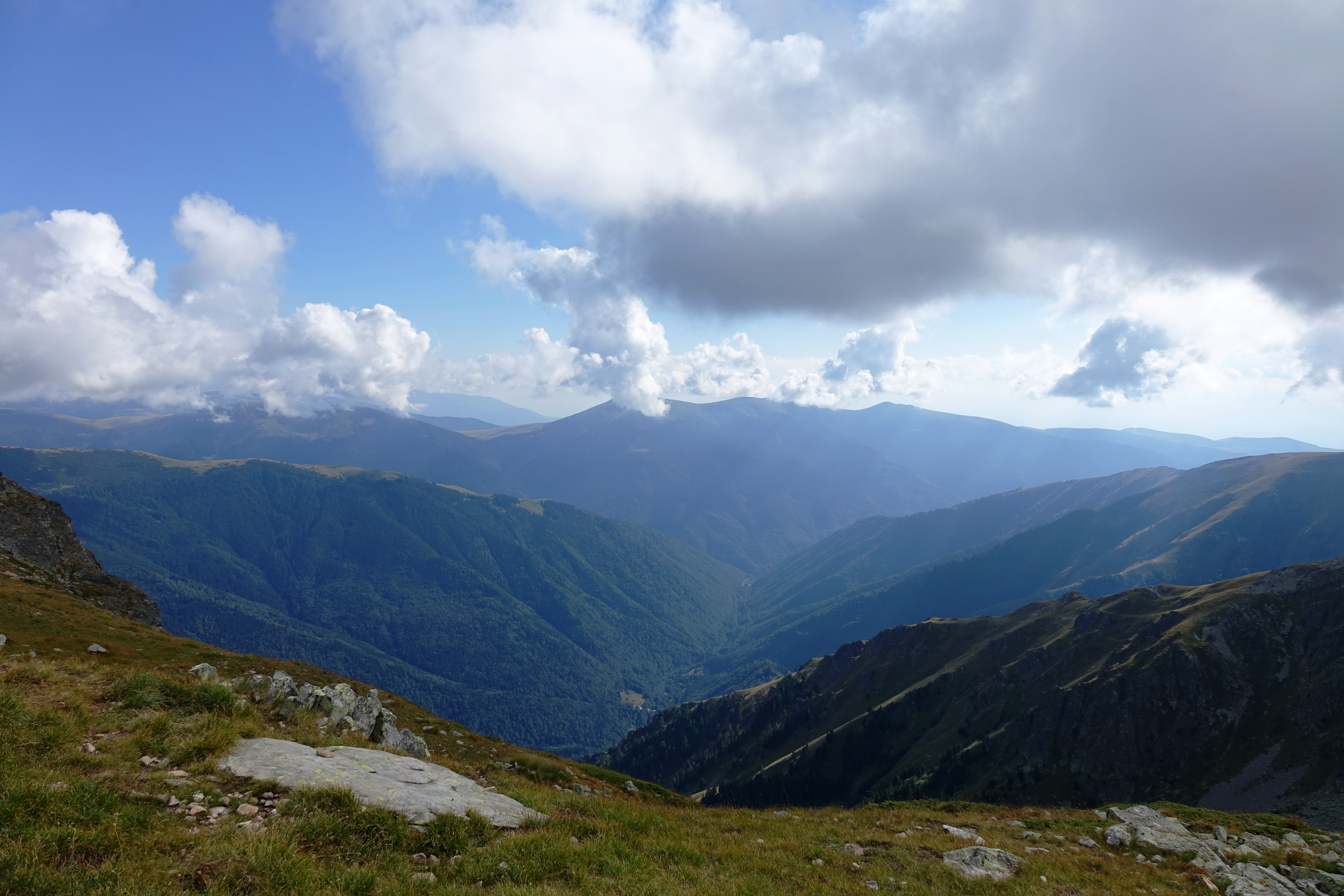
- The valley of the Rilska River

Location
- Country: Bulgaria

Physical characteristics
- Source
  - location: Ribni Lakes, Rila
  - elevation: 2,225 m (7,300 ft)
- Mouth
  - location: Struma River
  - coordinates: 41°31′54″N 23°14′53″E
  - elevation: 346 m (1,135 ft)
- Length: 51 km (32 mi)
- Basin size: 392 km^{2} (151 sq mi)

Basin features
- Progression: Struma→ Aegean Sea

The Rilska River (Bulgarian: Рилска река, Rilska reka, "Rila River") is a river in south-western Bulgaria, a left tributary of the Struma. The river is 51 km long and drains the western sections of the Rila mountain range.

== Geography ==
Under the name Manastirska River, it takes its source from the north-eastern corner of the Upper Ribno Lake in the western part of Central Rila at an altitude of 2,225 m in a cirque surrounded by the peaks Yosifitsa (2,697 m) in the east, Kanarata (2,666 m) in the south and Kyoravitsa (2,612 m) in the west. It flows through the Lower Ribno Lake, turns in north-western direction and after forming a large convex to the north it turns to the south-west. Following the confluence with its largest tributary, the Iliyna River, it flows in western direction under the name Rilska River. It forms deep and densely forested valley until it reaches the town of Rila and enters the plain and wide Dupnitsa Valley. There, the Rilska River turns in south-western direction and after 10 km flows into the Struma at an altitude of 346 m in the outskirts of the town of Kocherinovo.

Its drainage basin covers a territory of 392 km² or 2.27% of Struma's total. It borders the basins of the rivers Dzherman (a left tributary of the Struma) to the north and north-west, Iskar to the east and north-east, Mesta to the south-east and Blagoevgradska Bistritsa (a left tributary of the Struma) to the south.

The Rilska River has predominantly snow-rain feed with high water in late spring and early summer (May–June) and low water in winter (February). Its left tributaries have more contribution to the annual flow because they are situated in southern end of the valley on slopes that face in northern direction and accumulate more snow. The average annual flow is 6.26 m^{3}/s at the village of Pastra and 3.35 m^{3}/s at the confluence with the Struma. The overall annual flow is 241.9 million m^{3}, or 11.4% of Struma's total.

The river has low levels of mineralisation and is strongly saturated with oxygen.

== Economy ==
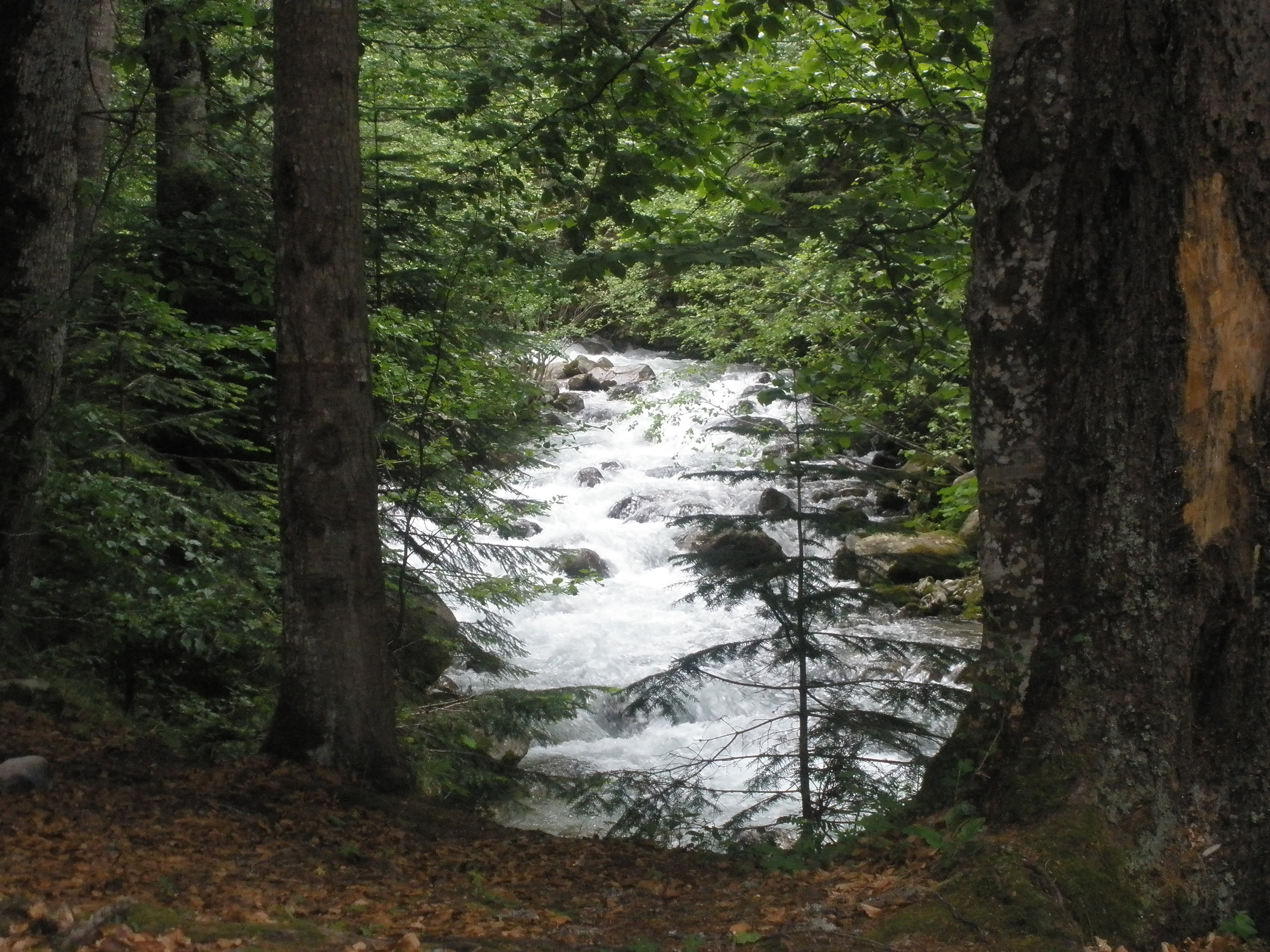
The upper course of the Rilska River

There are five settlements along the river: Pastra and Rila in Rila Municipality and Stob, Porominovo and Barakovo in Kocherinovo Municipality. The waters of the upper and middle course are used for electricity by the smalls hydro power stations of Pastra and Rila; the waters are also used for irrigation in the Dupnitsa Valley.

The entire length of 38 km of the third class road III-107 between Kocherinovo and the Rila Monastery follows the Rilska River valley.

The whole upper course and watershed of the river falls within borders of the Rila Monastery Nature Park. On the river's left banks some 4.8 km downstream of the confluence with the Iliyna is located the Rila Monastery, one of Bulgaria's oldest and most important sanctuaries. The monastery is an important national and international tourist destination and was designated an UNESCO World Heritage Site in 1983. Further downstream at the village of Stob, just south of Rilska River's left banks are situated the Stob Earth Pyramids, rock formations, known as hoodoos.
