= Gruevo =

Gruevo Груево
- Village
- Location within Bulgaria
- Coordinates: 41.5667°N 25.4167°E
- Country: Bulgaria
- Province: Kardzhali Province
- Municipality: Momchilgrad
- Elevation: 306.2 m (1,005 ft)
- Time zone: UTC+2 (EET)
  - Summer (DST): UTC+3 (EEST)

Gruevo is a village in Momchilgrad Municipality, Kardzhali Province, southern Bulgaria. As of 2021, the population stands at 591 residents, of which 303 are male, and 288 are female, with around 61% being from the age of 15 – 64 years old.

== Landmarks ==
=== Medieval Structure ===
Located about 30 km (19 mi) northeast of Gruevo, Perperikon is a medieval structure that is thought to have served as a Thracian sanctuary for the Roman god Dionysus. This site is included among the 100 National Tourist Sites.

=== Orlovi Skali ===
The Thracian sanctuary known as Orlovi Skali is approximately 41 km (25 mi) west of Gruevo, close to the neighboring village of Ardino. This site features 97 carved rock niches in the cliffs, which were used to place votive offerings by the cult of the dead.

=== The Stone Mushrooms ===
Nearby, around 30 km (19 mi) north of Gruevo, near the village of Beli Plast, are the Stone Mushrooms. These natural formations rise to heights of 2.5 to 3 meters (8.2 to 9.8 ft) and are created from volcanic rhyolite tuffs. Their pink hue is due to the mineral kloinoptilolit, while blue and black spots are from manganese nodules, and greenish tones come from celadonite. The area was listed as a natural phenomenon in 1974.

=== Healing Fountain ===
In the region between Gruevo and neighboring village Letovnik, there is a mountain peak referred to locally as Dambala. This spot, located in a deciduous forest, this peak features a high rock cliff and a fountain with several spouts at its base. It is believed that at midnight on May 5th, the water from this fountain gains healing properties and is thought to cure various diseases.
