= Staddle stones =

Elevated base for storage buildings

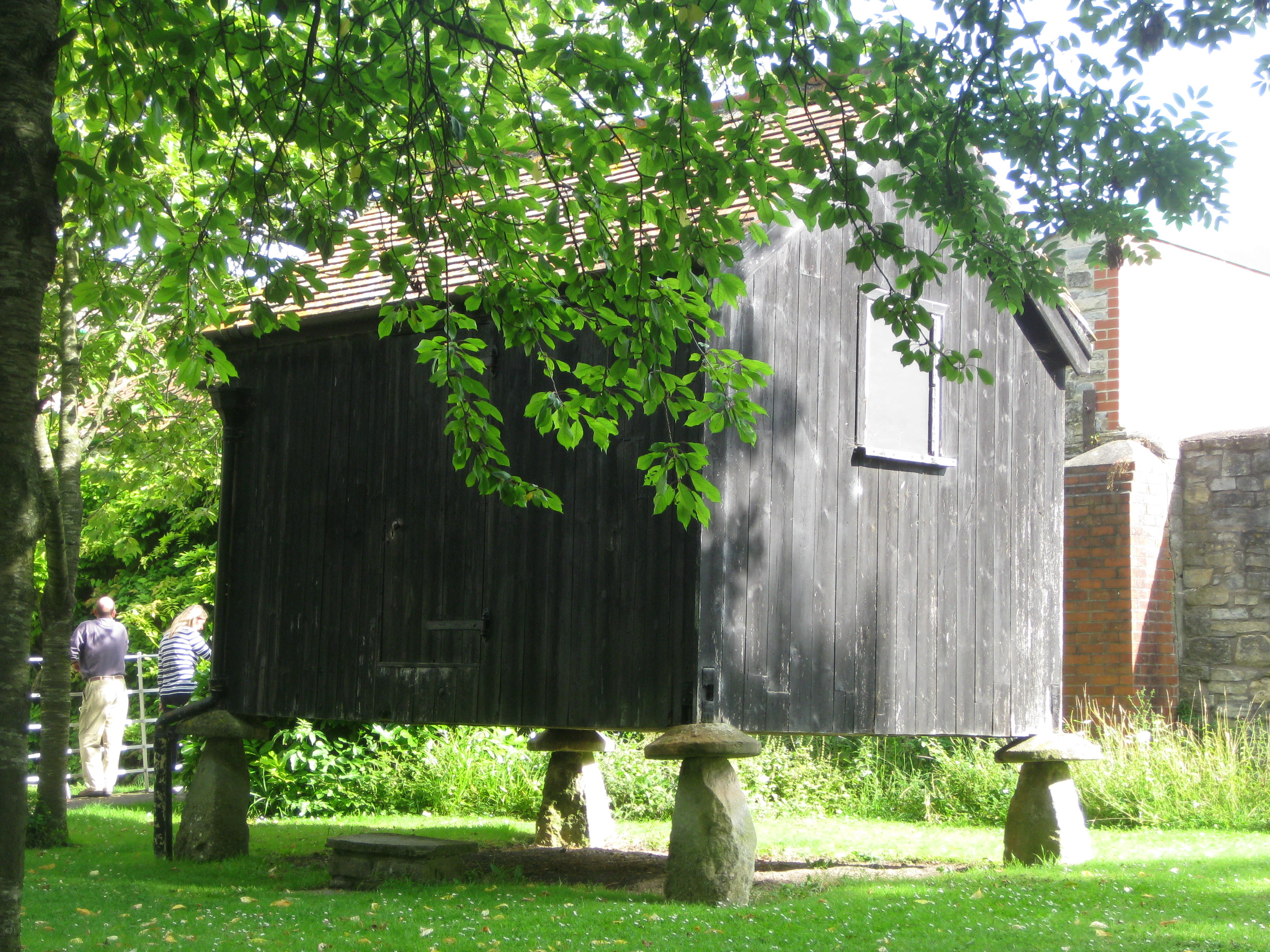
A granary sitting on staddle stones at the Somerset Rural Life Museum

Staddle stones, steddle stones, (Note: The term Steddle is a common dialectal variant of Staddle.) or straddle stones were originally used as supporting bases for granaries. The staddle stones lifted the granaries above the ground, thereby protecting the stored grain from vermin and water seepage. They were also used on other food and animal feed stores such as hayricks and game larders.

In Middle English staddle, or stadle, is stathel, from Old English stathol, a foundation, support or trunk of a tree. Staddle stones can be mainly found in Great Britain, Norway (stabbur), Galicia and Asturias (Northern Spain), and Ireland (corn stacks).

== Origins ==
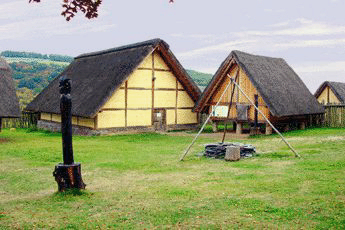
Modern reconstruction of Treveran dwellings at Altburg, Germany. Note the rectangular planform stone foundations. At right on staddle stones is a granary.

At a historical reconstruction of a Gallic settlement near Altburg Germany, staddle stones indicate that the structure above was used as a granary.

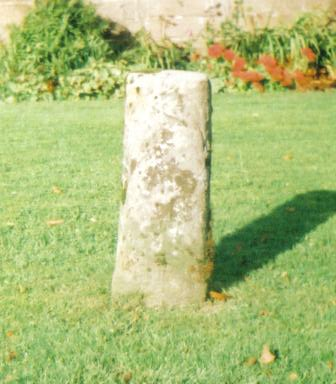
Staddle stone minus its top at The Coach House, Cunninghamhead, in North Ayrshire, Scotland

The name itself and evidence from surviving vernacular buildings with wooden 'feet' suggest that at first the staddles or supports were made of wood, such as at Peper Harow granary in Surrey. Stone staddles were longer lasting and a more reliable means of supporting structures which were sometimes a considerable weight.

The name has become integrated into the landscape with bridges, houses, farms and other structures incorporating the name 'staddle'.

In Ireland, these stones were known as corn stacks, stands, or straddles. They were often made from granite, and would set in circles to allow for the construction of a wooden or stone structure on top and thatched with something like oaten straw. Despite the name, they could be used to store barley, wheat, oats or rye. It was understood that corn stacks appeared in Ireland after the introduction of the brown rat, who was more likely to damage stored grain, but some archaeological evidence shows stacks in use in Ireland as early as the bronze age. They were in use in Ireland until the 1960s.

== Design ==
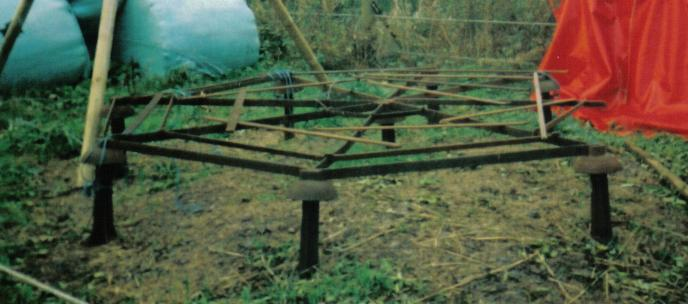
A cast iron stathel at Wester Kittochside, near East Kilbride

The staddle stones usually had a separate head and base which gave the whole structure a 'mushroom'-like appearance. Different areas in the United Kingdom had different designs. The base varied from cylindrical to tapered rectangular to near triangular. Flat-topped cone-shaped staddle stones are to be found in parts of the Isle of Wight. The tops are flat to support the beams, however some variation exists, such as square tops, fluted designs, slate tops, etc.

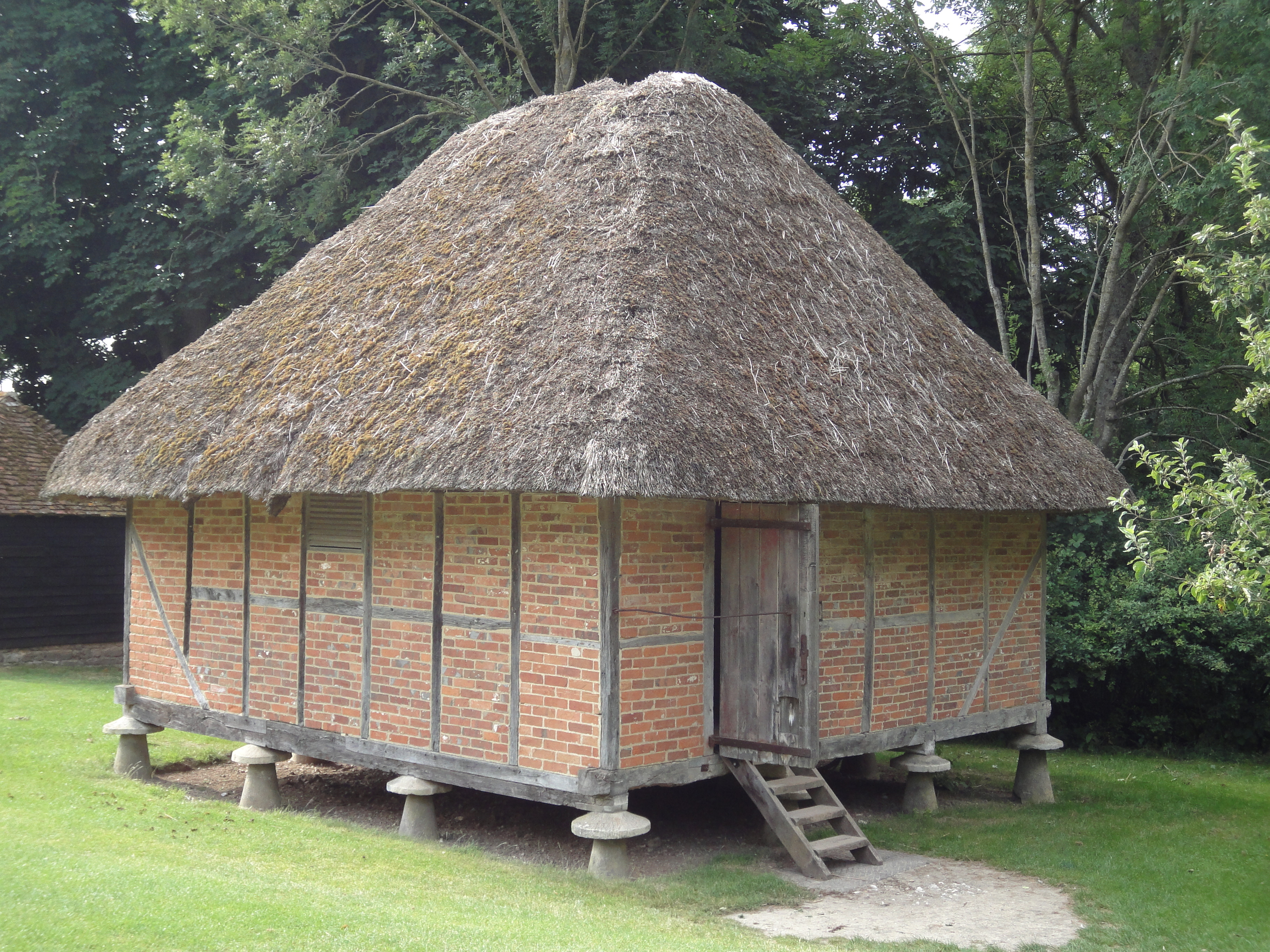
Granary sitting on staddle stones at the Weald and Downland Open Air Museum

A fine example is the English Granary built 1731, supported on staddle stones, which can be seen in the Weald and Downland Open Air Museum in West Sussex. Such structures were common in southern England in the 18th century. At Higher Farm in Heathfield, Tavistock, staddle stones are part of the substantial barns built by the Duke of Bedford in the 19th century. The dressed granite stone bases have specially hewn slate tops.

The materials used depended on the stone available, giving rise to sandstone, red sandstone, granite examples, etc.

The tower mill at Reigate on the Wray Common ceased to work in 1895. The mill had a granary standing next to it, supported by a large number of staddle stones.

The Museum of Scottish Country Life at Wester Kittochside near East Kilbride has two 'Stathels', made in Edinburgh of cast iron. The structure is basically a cast iron version of a set of staddle stones with its wooden framework. These rare survivals are still in use.

== Function ==
The base stones taper towards the top with an overlapping cap stone placed above, making it almost impossible for a rodent to climb up and into the hay or grain stored above. The air could freely circulate beneath the stored crops and this helped to keep it dry. A wood framework was placed onto the tops of the stones, the staddles being arranged in two or three rows, giving sixteen or more stones. The hayricks, Tithe barns, granaries, etc. were built on top of this frame.

=== Granaries and beehives ===
Staddle stones supporting beehives, circa 1880

These were often constructed with wooden weather-boards such as at Blaxland Farm in Sturry, Kent, which has nine staddles. However, if the grain was stored loose then the sides were filled in with brick nogging and light lath-and-plaster at the wall tops. Wooden steps up to the buildings were detachable and stored by hanging them up on the side of the structure. If stone or brick steps were built then the top step was not built, thus denying access to rats and other vermin. Some of these granaries had a 'cat flap' and others had a recess inside the steps which served as a dog kennel.

Most granaries were used for the storage of two or three separate crops, having a capacity of 500 to 2500 bushels. The arrangement of the stones to support the structure and its weight when in use, required nine, twelve or sixteen staddles. The production of staddles was therefore a fairly significant local industry. Small granaries could make do with five, one being in the middle. The Upper Hexford granary in Oxfordshire uses thirty-six staddles.

Beehives were often set on top of staddle stones to keep out predators and provide dry and airy conditions.

=== Game larders ===
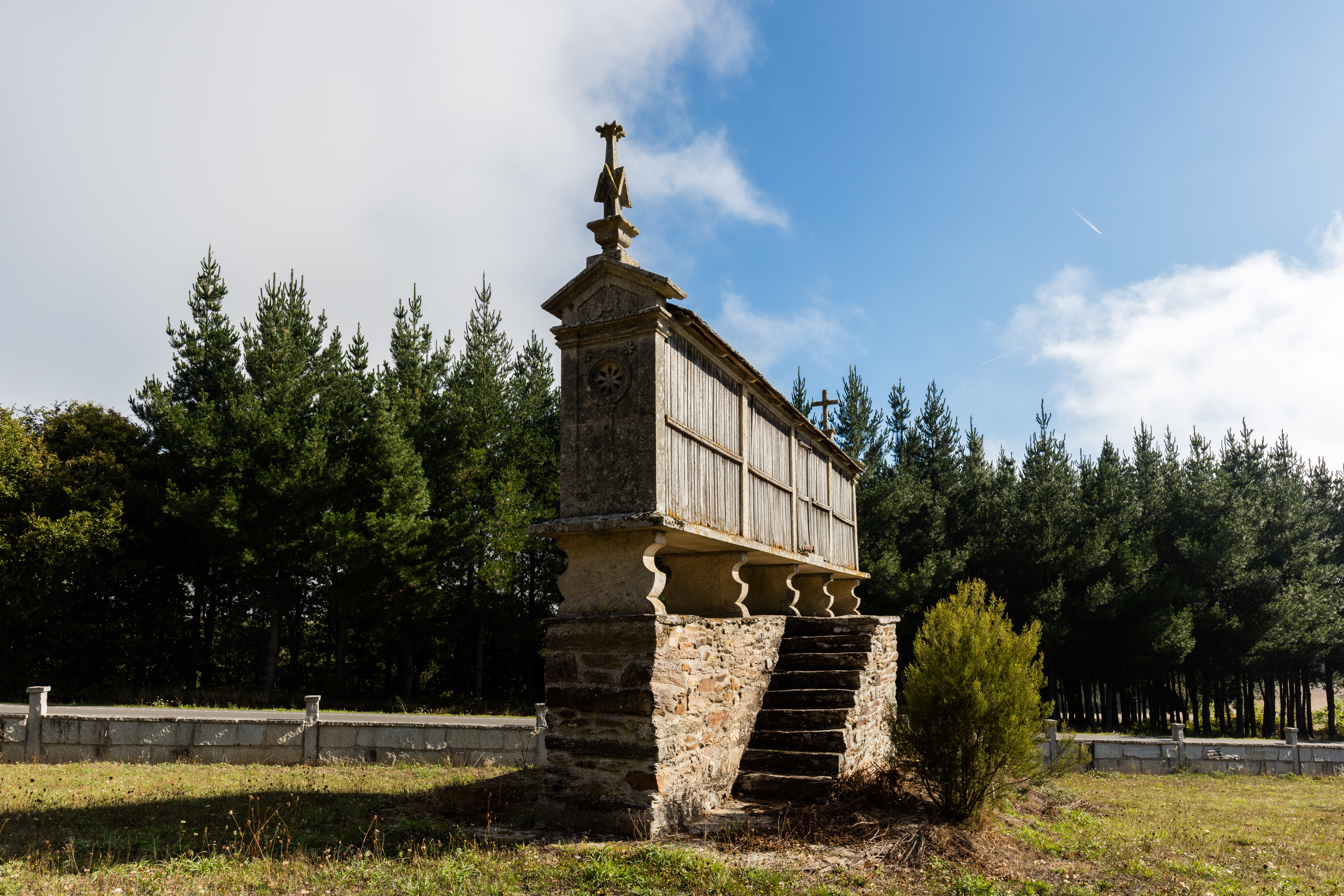
Hórreo (Galician granary) on staddle stones

Small staddle stones were used to support small roofed box-shaped game larders which were used on the larger estates for storage of game, such as pheasant, brought back by shooting parties, etc.

=== Barns ===
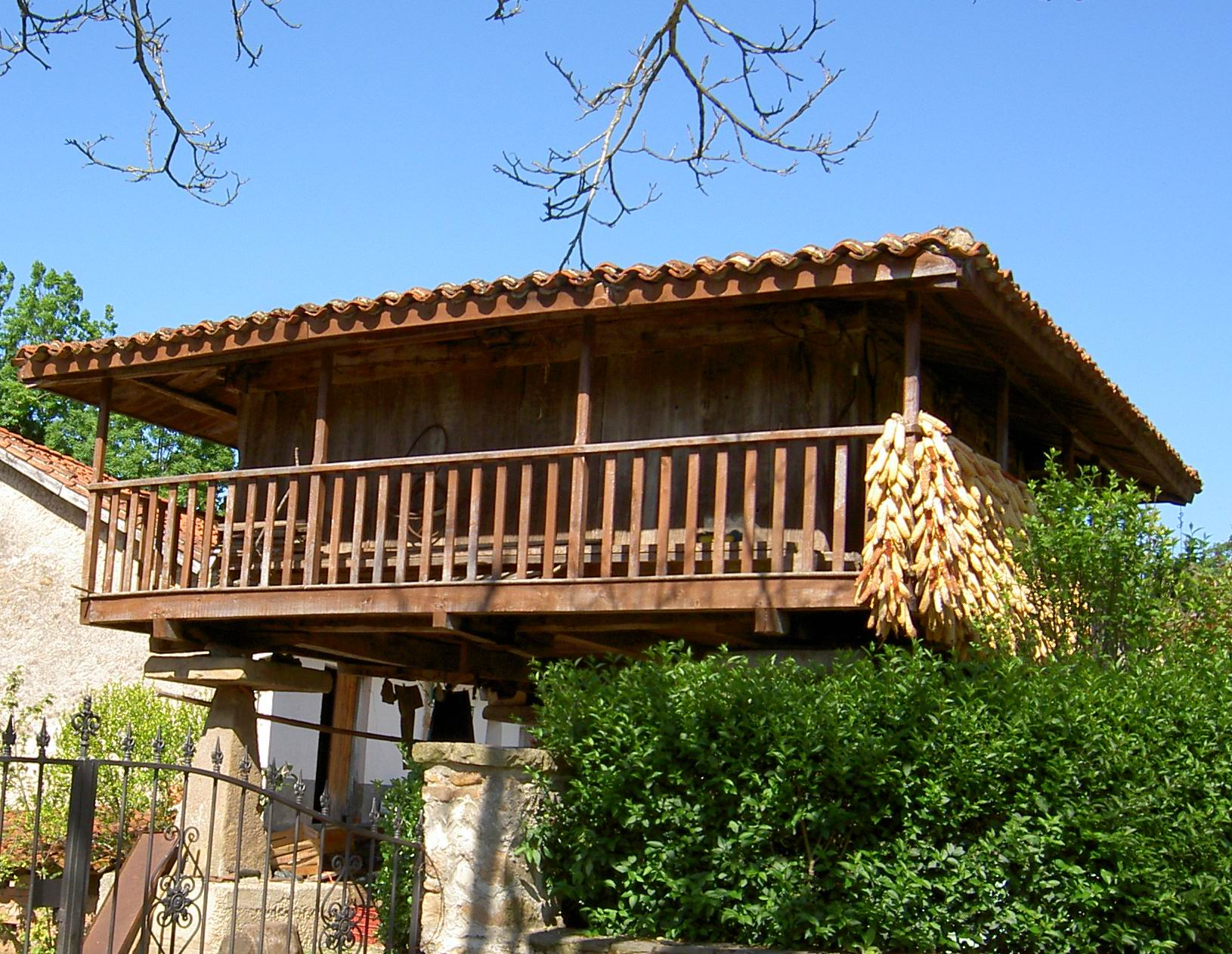
Hórreo asturiano in Deva, Gijón

Timber-framed barns raised onto staddle stones were sometimes found in the south of England. Apart from the usual benefits it seems that some correlation between this barn type and the builder being a tenant exists. Being on staddles such barns remained the property of the tenant.

In Galicia and Asturias (NW Spain), these barns are called hórreos, from the Latin word Horreum. In Asturias the stones are tall enough for the underneath to serve as cattle shelter.

== Landscape gardening ==
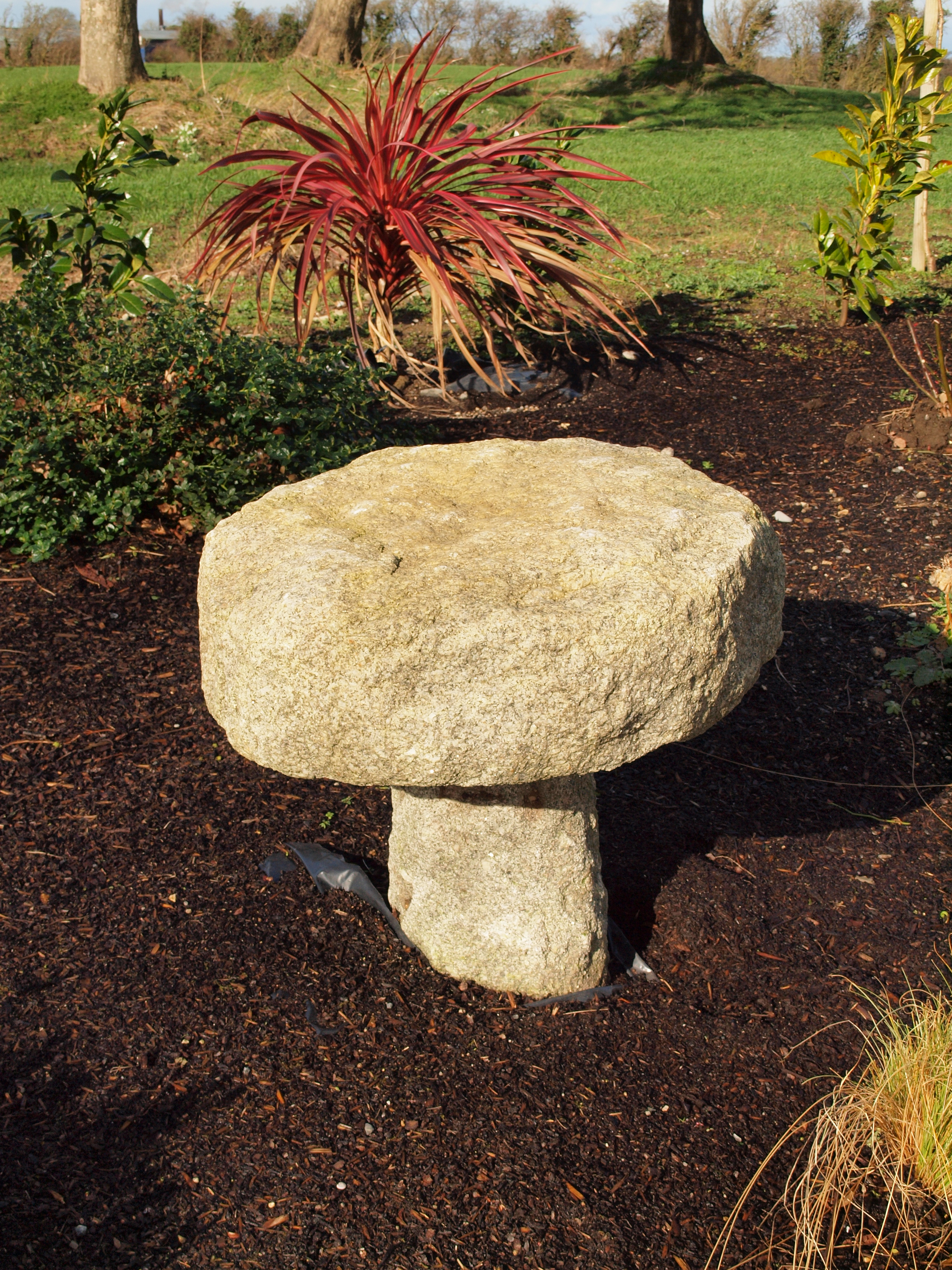
Remains of Irish granite corn stack being used as decoration, County Carlow

Staddles are often found in architectural salvage yards as they may be seen as attractive structures. They are also sold new, being made from moulded concrete. Chainsaws are used to produce wooden 'staddle stones' for use as garden seats or ornaments. In this context the staddle stones are often called mushroom stones.

== Conservation ==
Staddle stones are often over a century old and have developed a lichen 'patina' with slow and fast growing species adhering to the surfaces. The diversity of lichen flora adds to the biodiversity of a garden scene.

=== Surveyors marks ===
Old land deeds in northeastern United States often refer to Oak Staddle or Walnut Staddle. These deeds are from the late 18th century to the middle 19th century. Either the owners would cut a tree leaving the stump and request that the surveyors measure to it, or the surveyor would measure out to the location of a new lot corner and a staddle would be inserted into the ground like a boundary stone.

== See also ==
- The Lands of Cunninghamhead. An example of the rare Scottish Staddle Stone.
- Foundation (engineering) – Lowest and supporting layer of a structure
- Hórreo – Granery in northeastern Iberian peninsula
- Latte stone – Historical building supports
- Museum of Scottish Rural Life, Kittochside – National museum in South Lanarkshire, Scotland
