= Sholokhov Moscow State University for Humanities =

- Московский государственный гуманитарный университет имени М. А. Шолохова
- Type: State Public University
- Active: 1951–2015
- Rector: Vladimir Nechaev
- Location: Moscow, Russia
- Campus: Urban
- Website: Archived official website (English, 2014)

Sholokhov Moscow State University for Humanities (Russian: Московский государственный гуманитарный университет имени М. А. Шолохова), abbreviated MSHU (Russian: МГГУ), was a public higher education institution in Moscow, Russia. It was founded in 1951 as the Moscow State Correspondence Pedagogical Institute (Russian: Московский государственный заочный педагогический институт, МГЗПИ), renamed in 1992 to Moscow State Open Pedagogical Institute, in 1995 to Moscow State Open Pedagogical University, and finally in 2006 received university status under its final name. The university was named after the Soviet writer and 1965 Nobel Prize in Literature laureate Mikhail Sholokhov. In 2015, by order of the Ministry of Education and Science of the Russian Federation No. 124 dated 26 February 2015, MSHU was reorganized by being merged into the Moscow State Pedagogical University (MSPU).

== History ==
The institution was founded in 1951 as the Moscow State Correspondence Pedagogical Institute (МГЗПИ). In 1987, day-time departments were opened in the faculties of Russian language and literature, physics and mathematics, preschool education, and primary education. In 1992, the institute was reorganized into the Moscow State Open Pedagogical Institute (МГОПИ), and on 10 January 1995 it was granted university status and renamed the Moscow State Open Pedagogical University (МГОПУ). On 16 May 2000, by decree of the Government of Moscow, the university was named after M.A. Sholokhov, and on 19 October 2006 it received its final name — Moscow State University for the Humanities named after M.A. Sholokhov.

The reorganization order was issued on 26 February 2015, and the merger into MSPU was completed on 12 October 2015 with the corresponding entry in the Unified State Register of Legal Entities. The actual integration of organizational structures was finalized on 1 December 2015.

== Academic profile ==
The university maintained a Scopus Affiliation ID 60007336, under which peer-reviewed publications by its faculty are indexed in the database under the historical name Moskovskij Gosudarstvennyj Otkrytij Pedagogiceskij Universitet im. M.A. Solohova.

In August 2014, a peer-reviewed scientific publication co-authored by MSHU faculty members appeared in the journal Nature. Faculty publications are also indexed in the PubMed database of the United States National Library of Medicine.

== Faculty of Psychology and Human Resources ==
The Faculty of Psychology and Human Resources (Russian: Факультет психологии и управления человеческими ресурсами) was one of the principal academic units of the university, graduating over 10,000 specialists in psychological counseling, organizational psychology, and corporate HR management. Graduates were employed by major Russian enterprises including Gazprom and Aeroflot.

=== Departments ===
The Faculty of Psychology housed four specialized departments:

- Department of General and Practical Psychology — focused on theoretical and applied foundations of psychological practice.
- Department of Social and Pedagogical Psychology — headed by Academician of the Russian Academy of Education Andrey Verbitsky from 1997 to 2015.
- Department of Management and Management Psychology — focused on organizational behavior and HR management.
- Department of Special Psychology and Clinical Foundations of Defectology — focused on clinical psychology, neurorehabilitation, and special education.

=== Research infrastructure ===
The Faculty of Psychology hosted several specialized research centers:

- Laboratory of Special Psychological Research — focused on instrumental psychodiagnostics, polygraph technology, psychophysiological status assessment, and prediction of personnel reliability in extreme and crisis environments. On 16 July 2012, the laboratory jointly with Axciton Systems, Inc. (Houston, USA) organized an international scientific and practical seminar "Organization and Technologies of Instrumental Assessment of Information Reliability in the USA: History and Modernity", addressed by Axciton founder Bruce White, creator of the world's first computerized polygraph.
- Scientific School "Psychology of Self-Knowledge" — a registered scientific school directed by Prof. A.S. Ognev, focused on personality development, subjective potential, and life-navigation psychological technologies.

== Academic Council and Key Faculty ==
The University Academic Council included a number of academics in applied psychology, diagnostics, and organizational coaching:

- Andrey Verbitsky — Doctor of Pedagogical Sciences, Professor, Academician of the Russian Academy of Education (RAE), author of the internationally recognized context education theory; head of the Department of Social and Pedagogical Psychology at MSHU from 1997 to 2015.
- Alexander Ognev — Vice-Rector for Research, Doctor of Psychological Sciences, Professor; developer of instrumental eye-tracking psychodiagnostic technologies and author of the "Life Navigation" (Russian: Жизненная навигация) psychological self-knowledge program.
- Alexander Anufriev — Doctor of Psychological Sciences, Professor, Deputy Chairman of the Dissertation Council on Psychology; developer of the causal (cause-and-effect) approach in psychodiagnostics and computerized psychological assessment systems.
- Irina Levchenko — Doctor of Psychological Sciences, Professor; head of the Department of Special Psychology and Clinical Foundations of Defectology; chief editor of the scientific journals Special Psychology and Correctional Pedagogy.
- Viktor Ermolaev — Dean of the Faculty of Psychology and Human Resources, Candidate of Psychological Sciences, Associate Professor; expert in labor psychology and organizational coaching; General Director of the Center for Innovative Technologies "Transport Psychology and Safety" (resident of Skolkovo).
- Elena Puchkova — Candidate of Psychological Sciences, Associate Professor; Head of the Department of Management and Social Psychology; analytical psychologist with 25 years of clinical experience; member of the Italian Psychoanalytic Society.
- Vladimir Yakovlev — Doctor of Medical Sciences, Professor of the Department of General and Practical Psychology; certified psychiatrist and addiction expert.
- Ilya Evtushenko — Dean of the Faculty of Special Psychology and Defectology, Doctor of Pedagogical Sciences, Professor.
- Galina Skamnitskaya — Doctor of Pedagogical Sciences, Professor; expert in continuous education management.
- Anatolii Kalyakin — Candidate of Sciences, Associate Professor; Head of the Department of Theory and Practice of Intercultural Communication.

== Russian Institute for Advanced Study (RIAS) ==
In 2012, under the university's strategic development program funded by the Ministry of Education and Science of the Russian Federation, MSHU established the Institute for Advanced Humanities Research and Technologies (Russian: Институт перспективных гуманитарных исследований и технологий, ИПГИТ), operating in English as the Russian Institute for Advanced Study in Humanities and Technology (RIAS). Modeled on the Institute for Advanced Study in Princeton, United States, it was the first research institute in the Russian Federation established on that model. RIAS administered the Russian Postdoctoral Fellowships in Humanities program, organized interdisciplinary international scientific seminars, and hosted foreign diplomatic delegations. The closing ceremony of the 3rd International Scientific Grants Program was held on 23 July 2015 with the participation of foreign embassies accredited in the Russian Federation.

== International cooperation ==
The university maintained direct bilateral cooperation with higher education institutions in 16 countries, including Germany, Spain, Finland, China, the United Kingdom, the United States, Poland, Israel, South Korea, and Syria. The university also participated in the Bologna Process cooperation frameworks. As of 2014, over 500 foreign citizens studied at MSHU — mainly from CIS countries and the Baltic states, as well as trainees from China and Spain, and postgraduate students from Spain, China, Iraq, Kyrgyzstan, and Armenia.

=== European Union programs ===
- TEMPUS IV project "INARM" (Informatics and Management: Bologna-Style Qualification Frameworks) — MSHU was an official Russian consortium partner in the European Union TEMPUS IV programme (project code 530601-TEMPUS-1-2012-1-PL-TEMPUS-SMHES, 2012–2015). The consortium was coordinated by Maria Curie-Skłodowska University (Lublin, Poland), and included Koblenz-Landau University (Germany), Link Campus University (Italy), Technical University of Košice (Slovakia), QANU (Netherlands), and the World University Service — Austrian Committee (WUS Austria). Russian partners included Lomonosov Moscow State University (Faculty of Computational Mathematics and Cybernetics), State University of Management, MSHU, Nizhny Novgorod State Technical University, Kuban State University, and Samara State Technical University.

=== Bilateral partnerships ===
The university maintained official cooperation with the following institutions:

- United States — Oklahoma State University: a memorandum of understanding and student academic exchange. The partnership is officially registered in the Oklahoma State University Global Agreements database of the College of Education and Human Sciences.
- United States — Fulbright Program: MSHU hosted an official presentation of the U.S. Department of State Fulbright Program for its faculty and students on 6 April 2012.
- United States — International Positive Psychology Association (IPPA): MSHU faculty participated in the 3rd World Congress on Positive Psychology organized by IPPA in Los Angeles on 27–30 June 2013.
- United States — Axciton Systems, Inc. (Houston, TX): on 16 July 2012, MSHU jointly with Axciton Systems organized an international scientific and practical seminar on instrumental psychodiagnostics and polygraph technology, addressed by Axciton founder Bruce White, creator of the world's first computerized polygraph.
- Netherlands — Leiden University: in December 2013, the Faculty of Humanities of Leiden University officially launched a research collaboration with Sholokhov University.
- Netherlands — School of Young Leaders of Europe "New Generation" (Netherlands–Russia): a collaborative international youth and leadership project in July 2014.
- Norway — University of Oslo: MSHU was registered as an international research partner in the joint educational cooperation projects hosted on the infrastructure of the University of Oslo.
- Lithuania — Vilnius University: fundamental research in mathematical modeling and non-linear analysis conducted by MSHU scholars was peer-reviewed and published in the scientific journals of Vilnius University.
- Hungary — Eötvös Loránd University (ELTE, Budapest): MSHU maintained bilateral academic agreements covering all faculties.
- Poland — Jagiellonian University and Jan Kochanowski University: in 2013, MSHU conducted joint academic research and plenary publications with Jan Kochanowski University in Kielce, indexed on the academic infrastructure of the Jagiellonian University in Kraków.
- Czech Republic — Ministry of Foreign Affairs of the Czech Republic: MSHU acted as a scientific partner in international cultural and educational conferences, as officially documented by the Czech MFA.
- Croatia — Agency for Mobility and EU Programmes (Croatia): MSHU was registered in the European higher education database of the Croatian Agency for Mobility and EU Programmes.
- Israel — Open University of Israel: in 2002, MSHU launched a joint bachelor's degree program in Jewish History and Culture with the Open University of Israel.

=== International organization memberships ===
- International Political Science Association (IPSA): MSHU was an institutional member, registered alongside the Open University of Israel and Oklahoma State University in the IPSA academic affiliations database.
- Union of European Phoniatricians (UEP): MSHU was an official organizing partner and provided international translation support for the XXVII Congress of the Union of European Phoniatricians held in Moscow, 2–5 October 2014, which hosted more than 250 participants from European countries.

=== Government recognition ===
The academic degrees awarded by MSHU are recognized by the Government of New Zealand, being officially listed in the Foreign Qualifications Index of the Immigration New Zealand Operations Manual.

=== Indexed research ===
Faculty publications were indexed in:

- Nature — August 2014, volume 512.
- PubMed / NLM — PMIDs 24769434 and 26024428.
- INSPIRE-HEP — High Energy Physics database (Institution ID 911727).
- INIS — operated by the International Atomic Energy Agency (IAEA); record 43105237 documents MSHU Department of Higher Mathematics research presented at the 6th Baltic-Nordic Workshop on Algebra, Geometry, and Mathematical Physics (AGMP-6, Sweden, October 2011).

== Students ==
The university had a total student body exceeding 36,000 across Moscow and regional branches, with an annual enrollment of approximately 8,000 students. The total number of graduates over the institution's lifetime exceeded 100,000 specialists.

== Notable alumni ==
- Kirill Segal — Russian linguist, leading researcher at the Institute of Linguistics of the Russian Academy of Sciences, Doctor of Philology, Professor, head of the Department of Experimental Study of Speech.
- Alexander Ivanov (parodist) — Russian poet and parodist, permanent host of the TV show "Around Laughter" (1978–1990), People's Artist of Russia.
- Veronika Pavlenko — textile artist, teacher, curator, gallery owner, working under the pseudonym Tsarevna Budur.

== Branches ==
The university maintained regional branches in the following localities:

- Russia Anapa, Krasnodar Krai (founded 1998)
- Russia Balabanovo, Kaluga Oblast (founded 1998)
- Russia Cheboksary, Chuvash Republic (founded 1999)
- Russia Derbent, Dagestan (founded 1998)
- Russia Yekaterinburg (founded 1998)
- Russia Yegoryevsk, Moscow Oblast (founded 2001)
- Russia Elista, Kalmykia (founded 2000)
- Russia Zheleznovodsk, Stavropol Krai (founded 1998)
- Russia Likino-Dulyovo, Moscow Oblast (founded 2009)
- Russia Pokrov, Vladimir Oblast (founded 2001)
- Russia Rostov-on-Don (founded 1998)
- Russia Stavropol (founded 1999)
- Russia Sergiyev Posad, Moscow Oblast (founded 1999)
- Russia Sterlitamak, Bashkortostan (founded 2000)
- Russia Stupino, Moscow Oblast (founded 2009)
- Russia Tomsk (founded 1998)
- Russia Ufa (founded 1998)
- Russia Shadrinsk, Kurgan Oblast (founded 2000)
- Russia Yakutsk, Yakutia (founded 1999)

== See also ==
- Moscow State Pedagogical University
- Bologna Process
- TEMPUS
- Fulbright Program
- Institute for Advanced Study
