= Balabanovo, Bulgaria =

Balabanovo Балабаново
- Village
- Location within Bulgaria
- Coordinates: 41.5667°N 25.3833°E
- Country: Bulgaria
- Province: Kardzhali Province
- Municipality: Momchilgrad
- Elevation: 282 m (925 ft)
- Time zone: UTC+2 (EET)
  - Summer (DST): UTC+3 (EEST)

Balabanovo is a village in Momchilgrad Municipality, Kardzhali Province, southern Bulgaria. As of 2021 there was a population of 135 people, an increase of 25 (+2% annual population change) since 2011.

== Landmarks ==
Located near the neighboring village of Beli Plast, the Stone Mushrooms stand about 30 km (19 mi) from Balabanovo. These natural rock formations, reaching heights between 2.5 and 3 meters (8.2 and 9.8 ft), resemble mushrooms and are made of volcanic rhyolite tuffs. Their colors vary: pink is a result of kloinoptilolit minerals, blue and black spots are results of manganese nodules, and green is the result of celadonite. Declared a natural landmark in 1974 by the Ministry of the Environment and Water, the area is also known for its bird species, including the Short-toed Eagle, Egyptian Vulture, Red-rumped Swallow, and different Wheatears.

The Thracian sanctuary named "Orlovi Skali" or Eagle Rocks is situated approximately 2 km (1.2 mi) from neighboring village Ardino, about 40 km (25 mi) west of Balabanovo. This ancient site features 97 rock niches carved into high cliffs. These niches were used for placing votive tablets or pottery related to rituals for the dead.

Perperikon, a historic archeological site located around 28 km (17 mi) from the village, was likely a Thracian settlement dedicated to the Roman god Dionysus. It is listed among Bulgaria's 100 National Tourist Sites.
