= Balabanovo =

Balabanovo (Russian: Балабаново) is the name of several inhabited localities in Russia and a village in Bulgaria (Balabanovo, Bulgaria).

== Modern localities ==
Urban localities

- Balabanovo, Kaluga Oblast, a town in Borovsky District of Kaluga Oblast

Rural localities

- Balabanovo, Moscow Oblast, a village under the administrative jurisdiction of Sofrino Work Settlement in Pushkinsky District of Moscow Oblast

== Abolished localities ==
- Balabanovo, Kirov Oblast, a village in Kichminsky Rural Okrug of Sovetsky District in Kirov Oblast; abolished in July 2012; 57°13′N 48°50′E
