= Mushroom stones =

Limestone boulders undercut by weathering

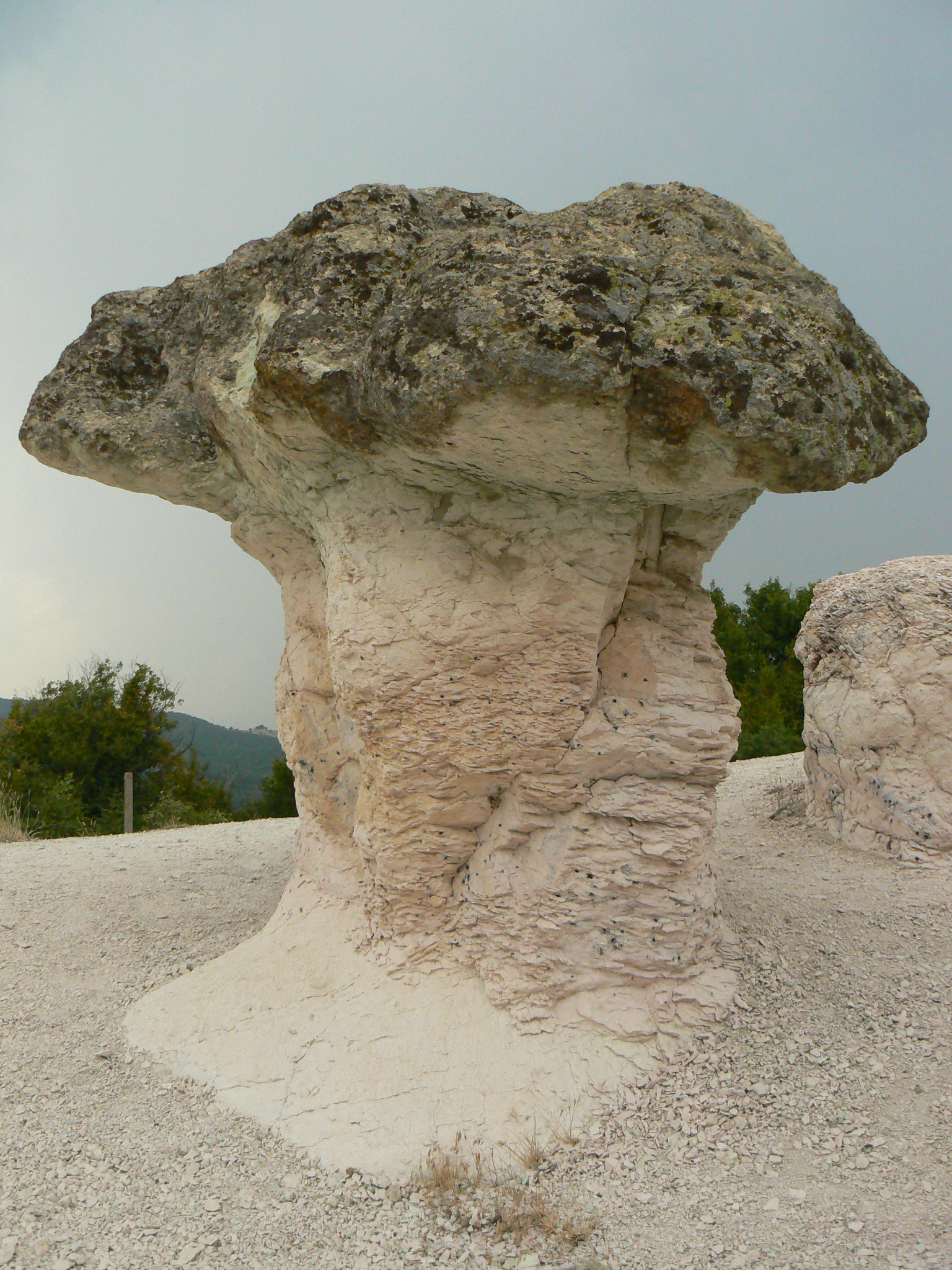
The Stone Mushrooms near Beli Plast Village in Bulgaria

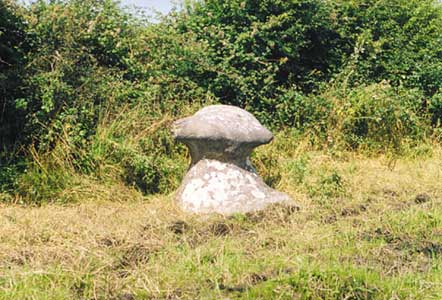
A mushroom stone at Inchiquin Lough, County Clare in Ireland.

Plate 1,'Wavestone' at Gortlecka, R32011 94965, The Burren, Co. Clare.

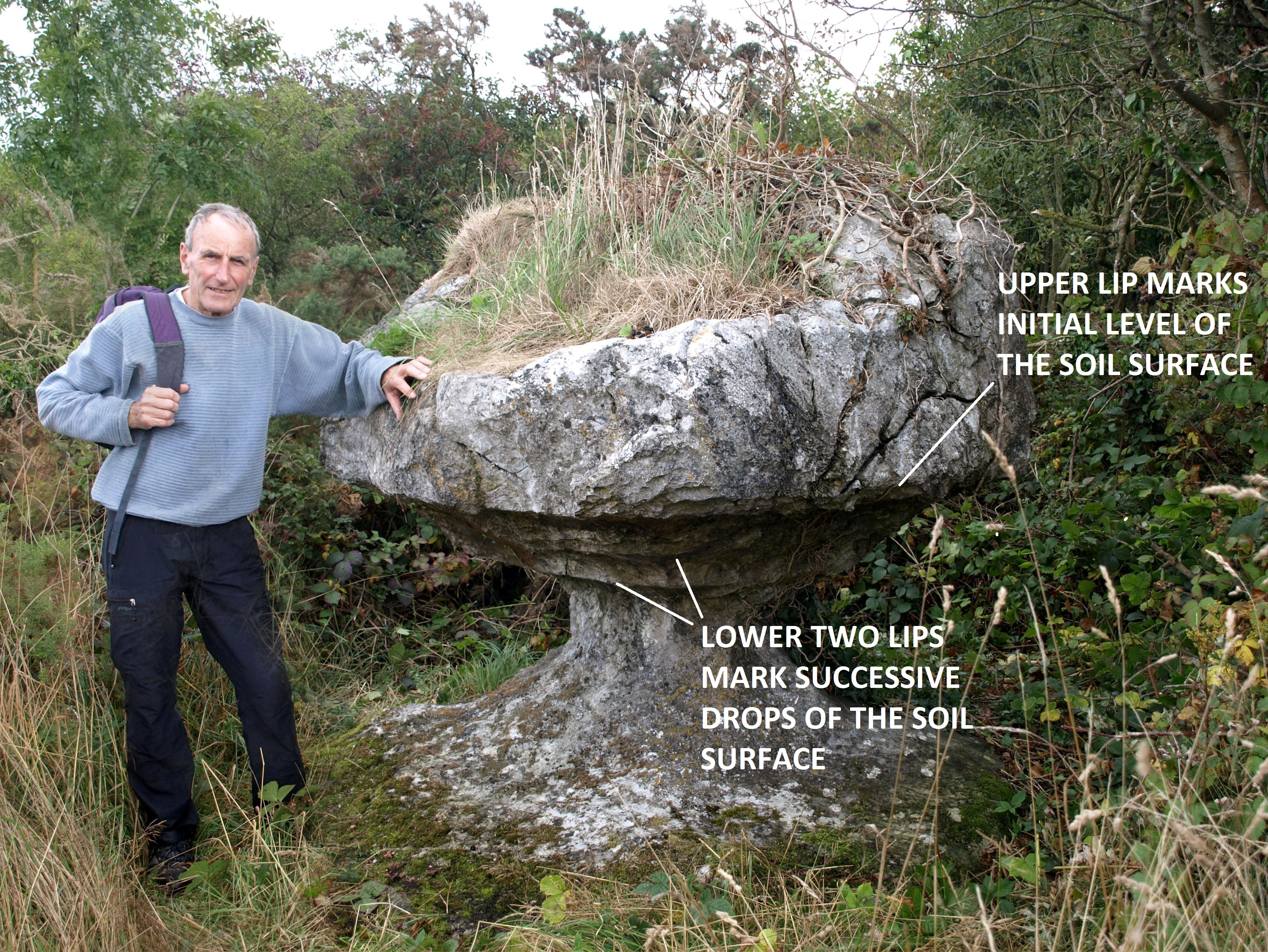
Plate 3: 'Wavestone' at Cornaseer, M99581 47138, Lough Ree, Co. Roscommon.

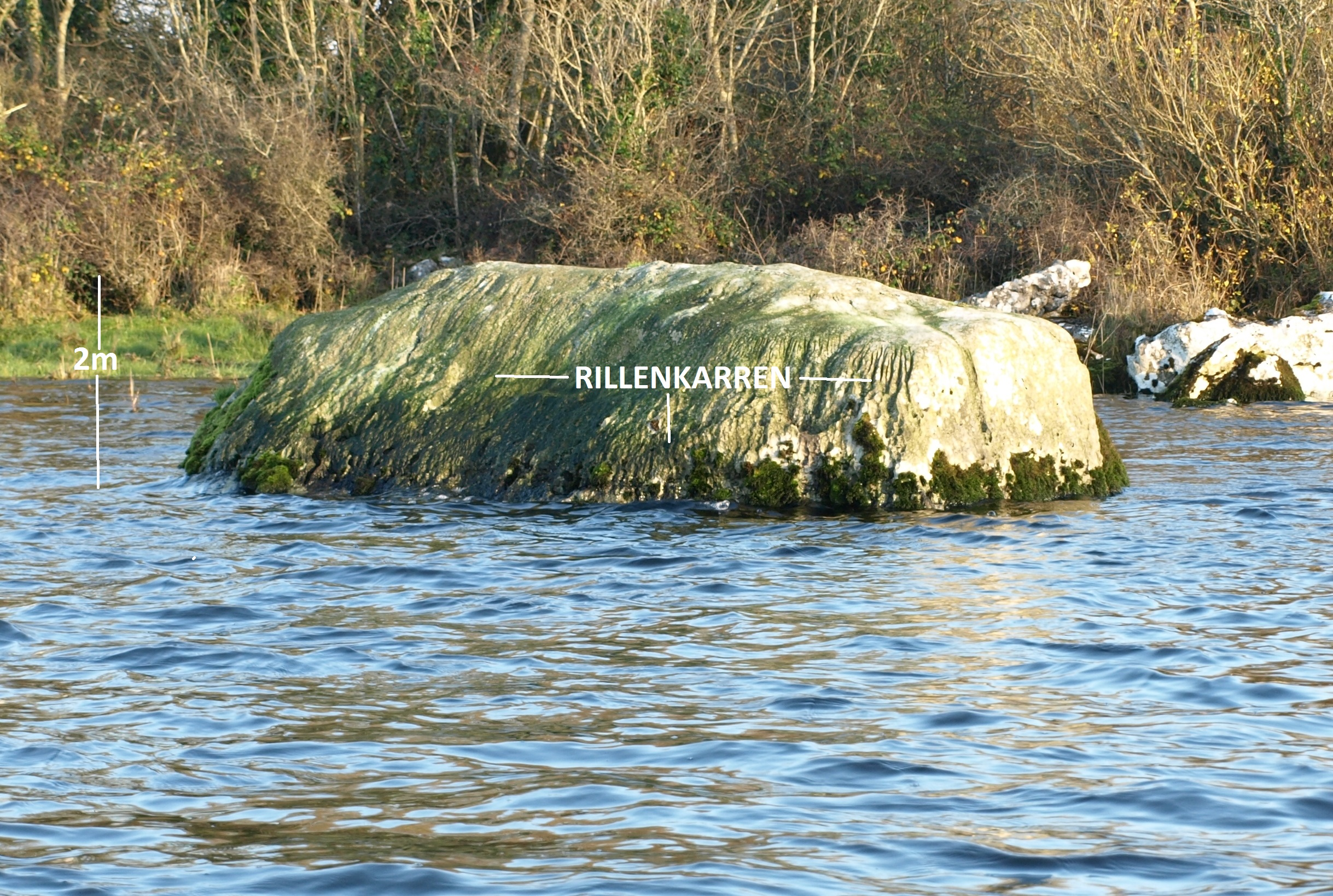
Plate 4: The Cahir Rock, R27345 89972, Inchiquin Lough, Co. Clare.

Mushroom stones, or mushroom rocks, in Ireland are limestone boulders undercut by past weathering regimes. These rocks take the form of solitary sentinels of limestone which still bear the unmistakable marks of long-continued erosion by ice, soil or lapping waves at the edge of lakes which have since vanished or retreated. These stones are sometimes shaped like mushrooms, others have an overhang facing in just one direction, but all are notched and undercut in such a fashion as to suggest prolonged exposure to standing water at some time in the past. The mushroom-shaped stones are produced where the notching forms a fairly even circle around the stone.

Where a limestone boulder stands at the edge of a lake so that it is partly covered by water, the underwater part weathers more rapidly than the part above water because it is subject to more constant corrosion by water, accentuated by the abrasive lapping action of waves. If this continues for a long time the upper part will be undercut, and the stone will assume a very distinctive form which is frequently mushroom-like. Much more rarely the same process can be seen in limestone bedrock. Many mushroom stones have a second minor 'lip' below the main one, suggesting that the drop in water level which isolated the stones from the lake's edge took place in two stages.

== Ireland ==
The wavestones in Ireland are always of limestone: generally isolated boulders which are often glacial erratics, or (much more rarely) exposed outcrop. In Ireland, wave stones were first recorded in 1865 by F.J. Foot along the shores of Lough Ree, during the course of field work for the first systematic geological survey of Ireland. He made a drawing of these water-worn limestone blocks 'eroded up to a certain height by the solvent action of former lake water, showing the level at which Lough Ree once stood – 10 to 15 feet higher than the present summer height: the lake shore, moreover, is now some 300 yards distant.' To date, wavestones have been recorded in Counties Offaly, Tipperary, Galway, Clare, Cork, Limerick, Roscommon and Westmeath (see map below in External Links).

Not all mushroom stones are situated close to modern lakes. Many mark the shores of lakes which have vanished altogether, becoming filled in with reedswamp, fen and bog vegetation in the course of time. A remarkable example is located near Crancreagh Bridge in County Offaly, which marks the position of what must have been the north-western edge of ancient Lough Boora, on whose shores the first people of the Irish midlands camped in Mesolithic times 8,500 or so years ago. This ancient lake disappeared long ago, swamped by the growing expanse of bog, which buried not only the lake itself, but preserved the campsites of the early midlanders.

== Ireland's wavestones ==
No scientific evidence has been published to verify that all the Irish wavestones have formed in lakes. Furthermore, no wavestones have been described from present-day lakes in Ireland, which is puzzling as parts of the country, such as The Burren, are studded with lakes containing many partly submerged Carboniferous limestone erratics. A requirement for limestone solution is that water must essentially be 'acidic' (pH below 7). Yet, a study of six wavestone sites in Ireland, namely Ballard Bridge, Cornaseer, Creevagh, Gortlecka, Killinaboy and Rinnamona, found that nearby lakes, in which the wavestones are said to have formed, are 'alkaline' (pH above 7) with a pH range from 7.6 to 8.5. In fact, the water in three of the lakes, Loughs Gealáin and Ree, and Rinnamona Lough, is so alkaline that marl (lime mud) is being precipitated. The alkalinity of the lake water means that it would cushion limestone against solution rather than dissolve it. This (and other field evidence, such as wavestone morphology) indicates that the wavestones at these six sites have not formed in present day lakes. However conditions may have been different in post-glacial times.

There is some evidence that undercutting of limestone can result from solution in soil that abuts rock, and measurements of soil water at the six sites showed that it is 'acidic' (pH below 7) with a pH range from 5.3 to 6.8. It has been noted that the Irish landscape has been profoundly altered by drainage operations, that signs of peat cutting are common in the Burren fens and that extensive deforestation has occurred in Ireland, all of which can lead to a lowering of the land surface. For instance, the ground in Holme Fen, England, subsided by 1.8m in the first decade after its initial drainage in 1851, a figure that is typical of initial peat subsidence rates. Accordingly, it is proposed that the wavestones at the six sites were undercut by soil water when soil levels were higher than today. It follows, therefore, that the studied wavestones are not, in fact, 'wavestones'. More accurately, they are mushroom rocks that have formed in a terrestrial setting.

Three examples of 'wavestones' that illustrate mushroom rock formation in a lost-soil environment and a mid-lake, non-undercut Carboniferous limestone erratic occur respectively at Gortlecka, Creevagh and Cornaseer, and in Inchiquin Lough.

The base of the 'wavestone' at Gortlecka (Plate 1) is winter-flooded by Lough Gealáin (pH 8.2), and the horizontal surface of the water contrasts strongly with the sloping and undulating lip. The lake water pH and lip shape both signify that formation cannot have occurred in the lake. Instead, the sharply defined lip marks the former level of the (undulating) soil surface, below which solution by soil water (pH 6.0) occurred.

In contrast, the 'wavestone' at Creevagh (Plate 2), which occurs inside a meander of the River Shannon (pH 8.3), seems an obvious candidate for formation in a lake since its lip is horizontal. The lake surface, though, would have to remain at exactly the same height for a remarkably long period to create such a lip, while wave-splash would lead to a rounding of its edges. It is probable that sub-soil solution (pH 5.4) is occurring beneath the coarse grass that abuts the limestone in the foreground. If this is long-continued it would eventually lead to the formation of a dipping lip akin to that on the 'wavestone' at Gortlecka.

The 'wavestone' at Cornaseer (Plate 3) is regarded as being the 'type' model, and its yawning undercut (mean 80 cm deep) is a significant feature. If the undercut had resulted from solution in Lough Ree (pH 8.5) then similar undercutting ought to be present elsewhere alongside the lough at the same height (about 40m above O.D.). None, however, was found, which indicates that solution at Cornaseer was a local phenomenon. It is perhaps significant that the word 'Bog' occurs some 300m west of the site on an 1865 survey map and equally significant that the bog no longer exists due to drainage. The mean pH of soil water at Cornaseer is 5.3 and that of neighbouring Clooncraff Bog is 5.8. The three lips represent successive lowering of the soil surface.

The Cahir Rock (Plate 4) is a large Carboniferous limestone erratic found in Inchiquin Lough (pH 7.8), which shows no sign of notching by present day lake water. Nevertheless, solution in a more extensive lake is held responsible for the notching of the 'wavestones' at Killinaboy (soil water pH 5.7) some 1 km to the north. Killinaboy lies several metres above the present-day lake level, but Cahir Rock cannot have been overtopped by Inchiquin Lough because its upper surface is etched with rillenkarren, which are a sub-aerial solutional landform

It has been pointed out that mushroom-shaped rocks close-to and far-from lakes in Ireland are similarly shaped, thus the obvious question of whether some or all of Ireland's mushroom-shaped rocks have developed in a sub-soil environment or a post-glacial lake environment remains.
