= Orlovi Skali =

- Орлови скали
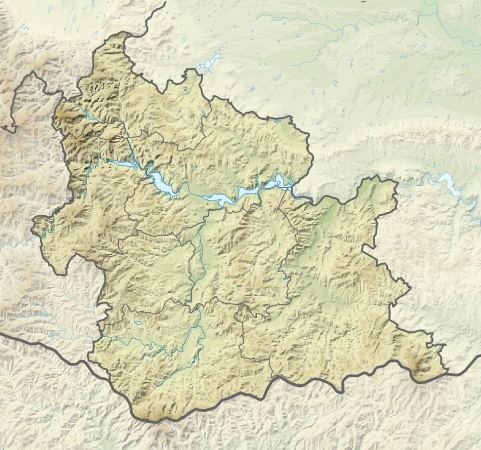
- Location within Kardzhali Province
- 41.5662°N 25.1460°E
- Type: Sanctuary
- Periods: Thracians
- Location: Ardino

Orlovi Skali is a historic site in Ardino, Bulgaria. The site consists of niches cut into a large rock standing above the forest. The site seems to have had some religious significance.
