= Altburg =

Altburg is the name of the following places:

- Altburg (Calw), village in the borough of Calw in Baden-Württemberg, Germany
- Altburg (castle), a reconstructed Celtic settlement near Bundenbach in the Hunsrück, Germany
- Altburg ZH, hamlet in the municipality of Regensdorf in the canton of Zürich, Switzerland
  - Alt-Regensberg Castle, a castle in same location

Altburg is the name of the following people:

- Altburg Marie Mathilde von Oldenburg (1903–2001), daughter of Frederick Augustus II of Oldenburg
