= Letovnik =

Coordinates: 41.5833°N 25.4333°E

Letovnik Летовник
- Village
- Interactive map of Letovnik
- Country: Bulgaria
- Province: Kardzhali Province
- Municipality: Momchilgrad
- Time zone: UTC+2 (EET)
  - Summer (DST): UTC+3 (EEST)

Letovnik is a village in Momchilgrad Municipality, Kardzhali Province, southern Bulgaria.
