= The Stone Mushrooms =

Coordinates: 41°47′3″N 25°25′56″E

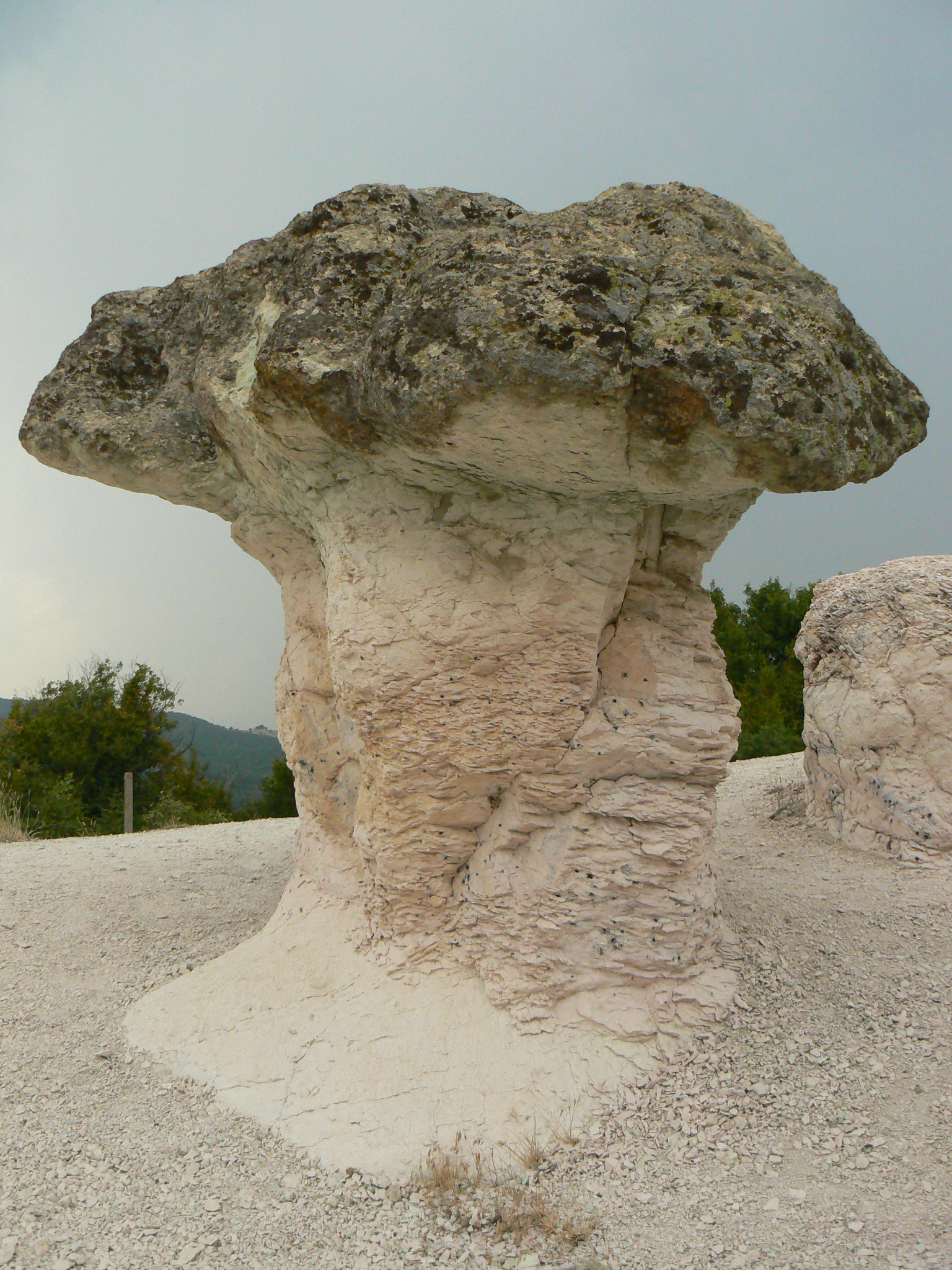
The Stone Mushrooms near Beli Plast Village

The Stone Mushrooms (Bulgarian: Каменните гъби) are a rock phenomenon near Beli plast village in Bulgaria, on the road between Haskovo and Kardzhali. They are about 2.5 metres tall. The 3-hectare (7.4-acre) area was declared to be a natural resource on 13 May 1974, according to №РД-552 bill of the Ministry of Environment and Water. Interesting kinds of birds can be observed in the area: short-toed eagle, Egyptian vulture, red-rumped swallow, eastern black-eared wheatear, etc.

== Gallery ==
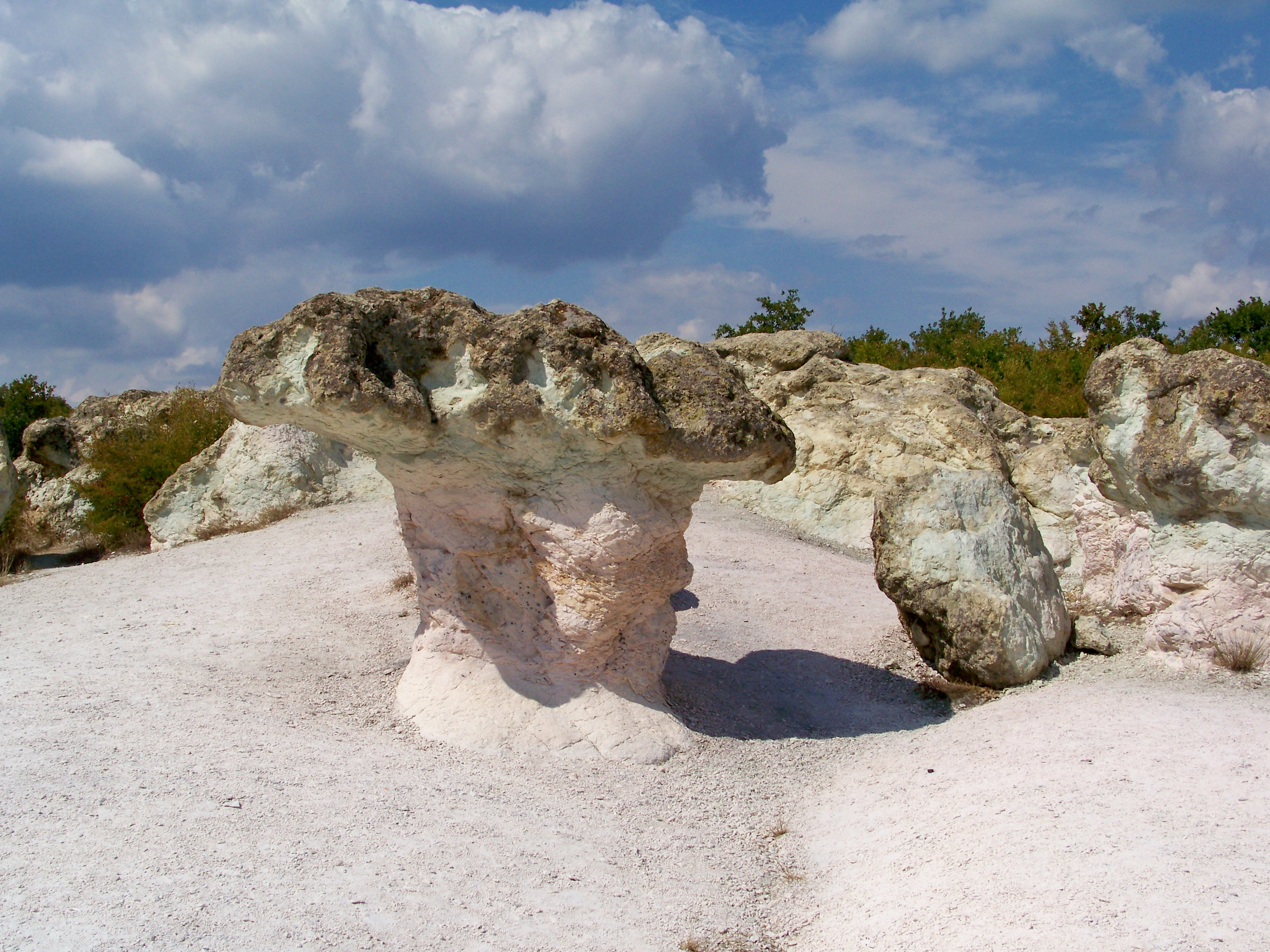

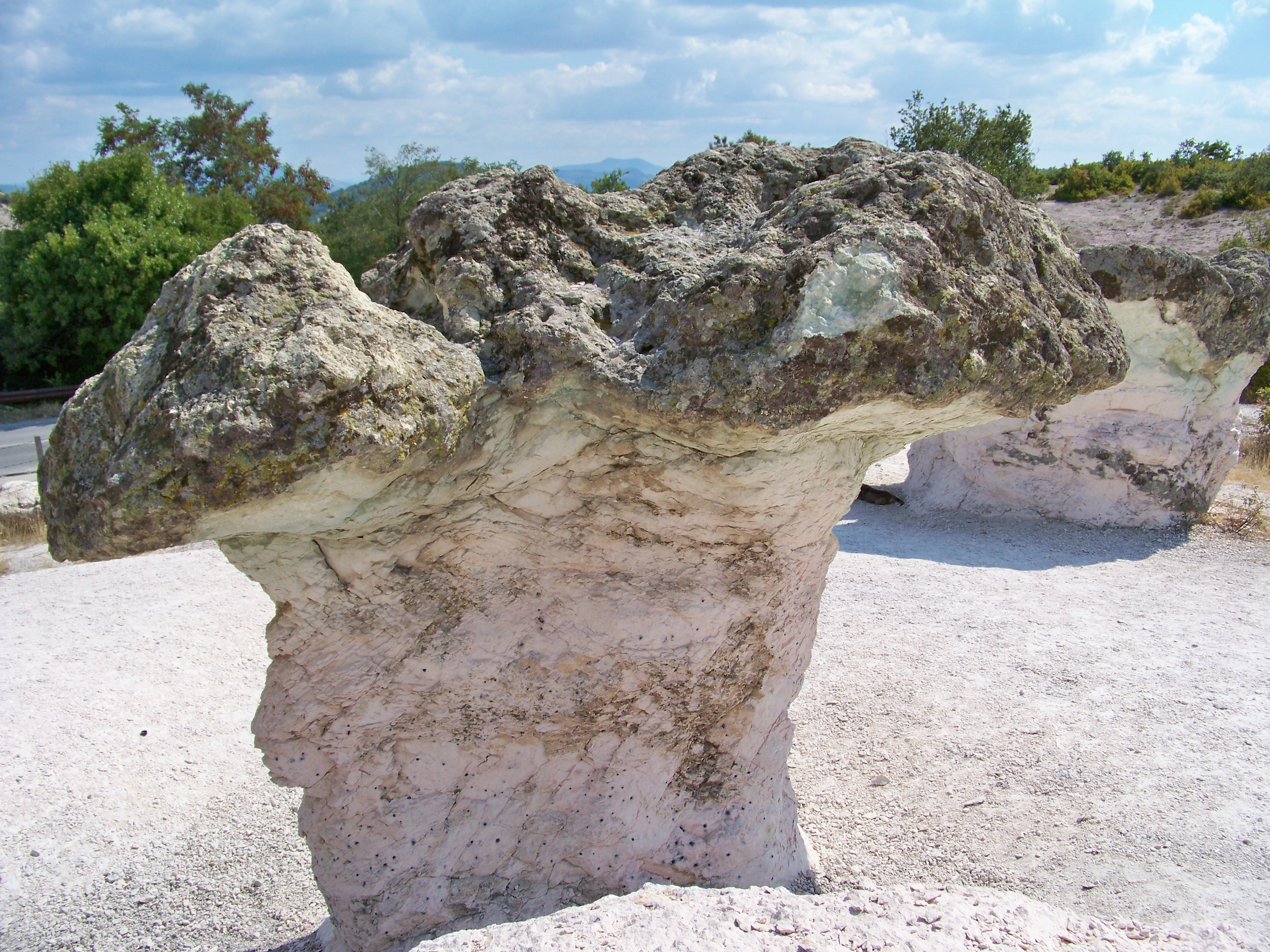

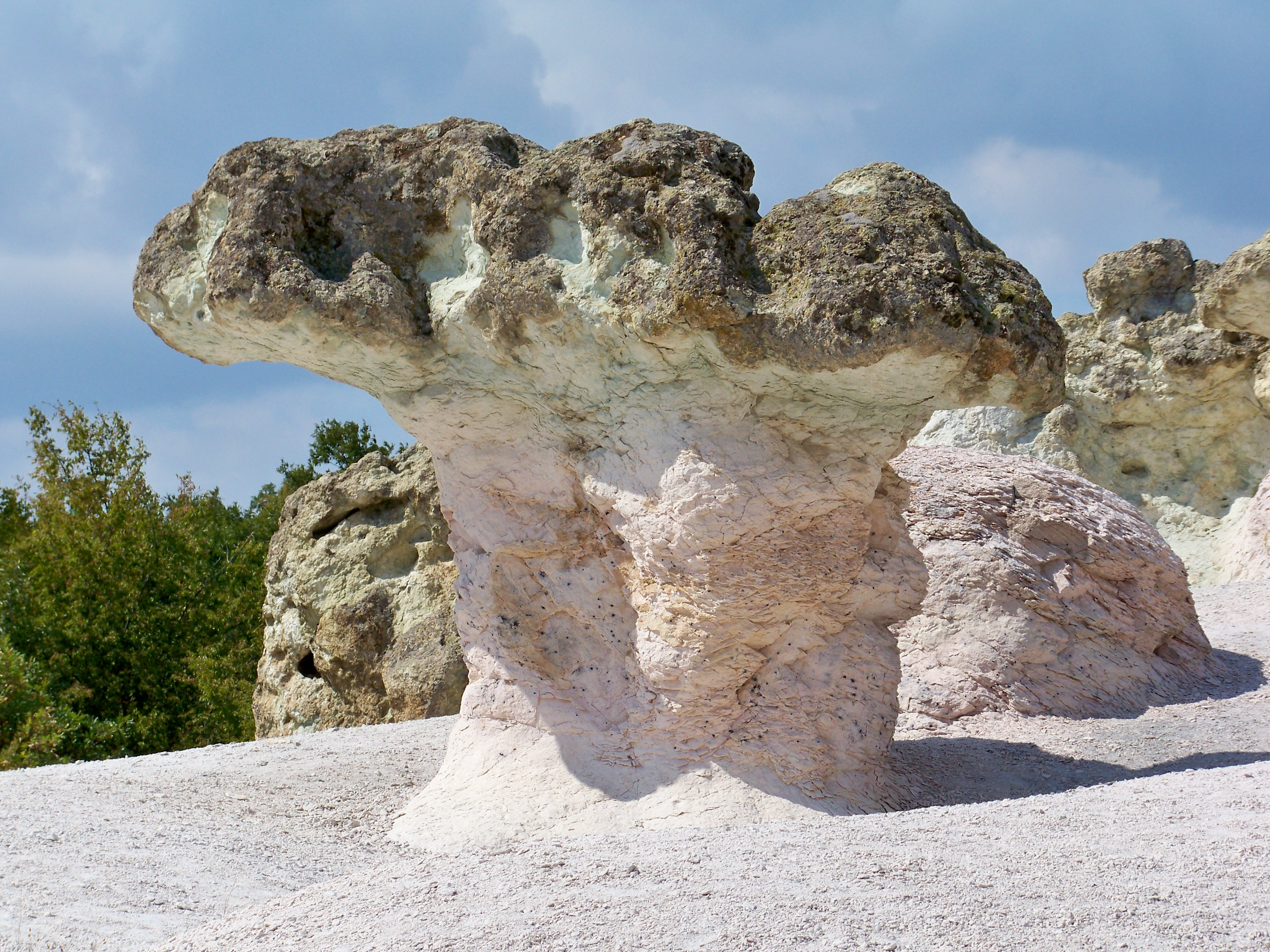

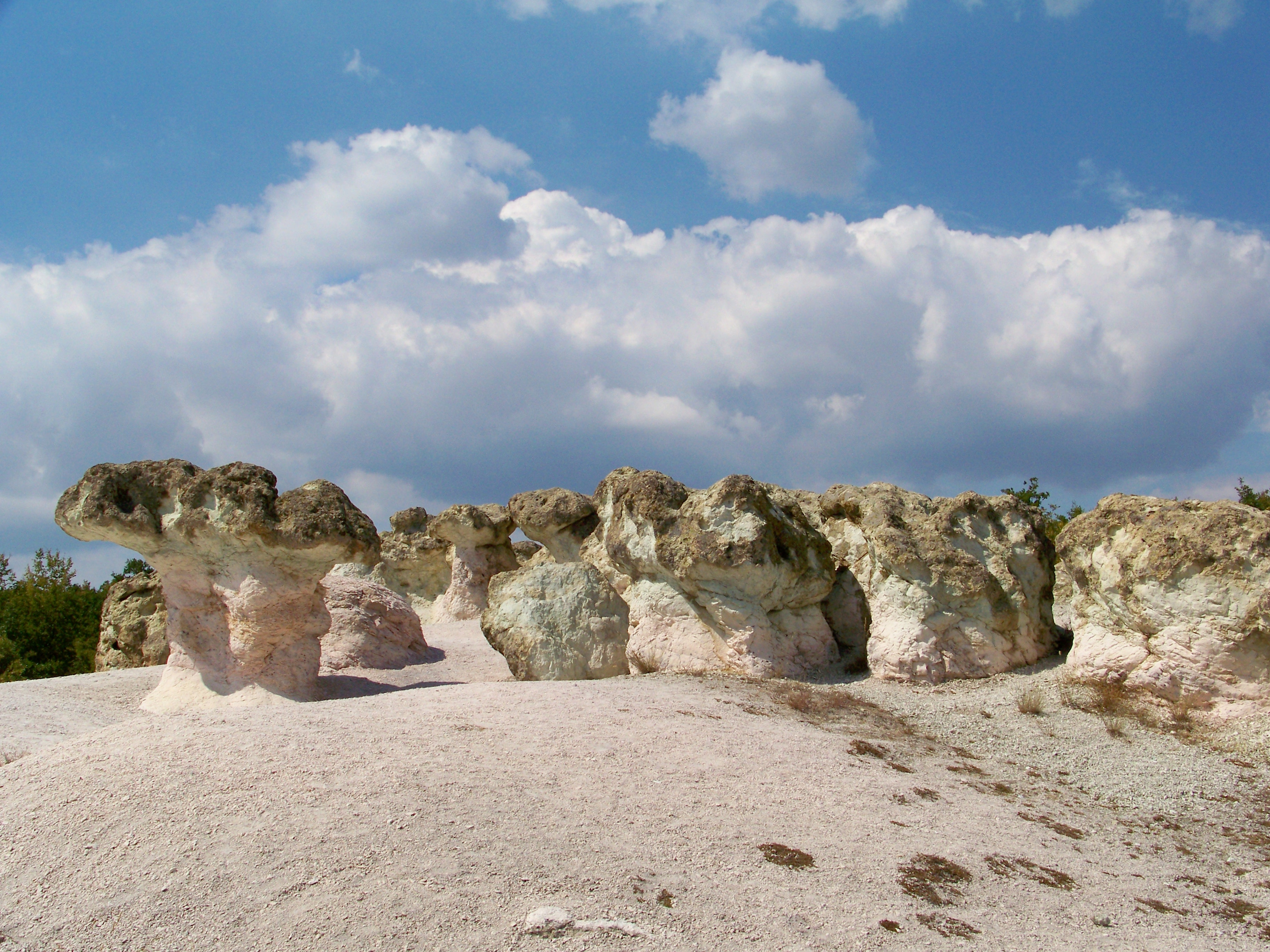
