= Vlahina =

Mountain range on the border of Bulgaria and North Macedonia

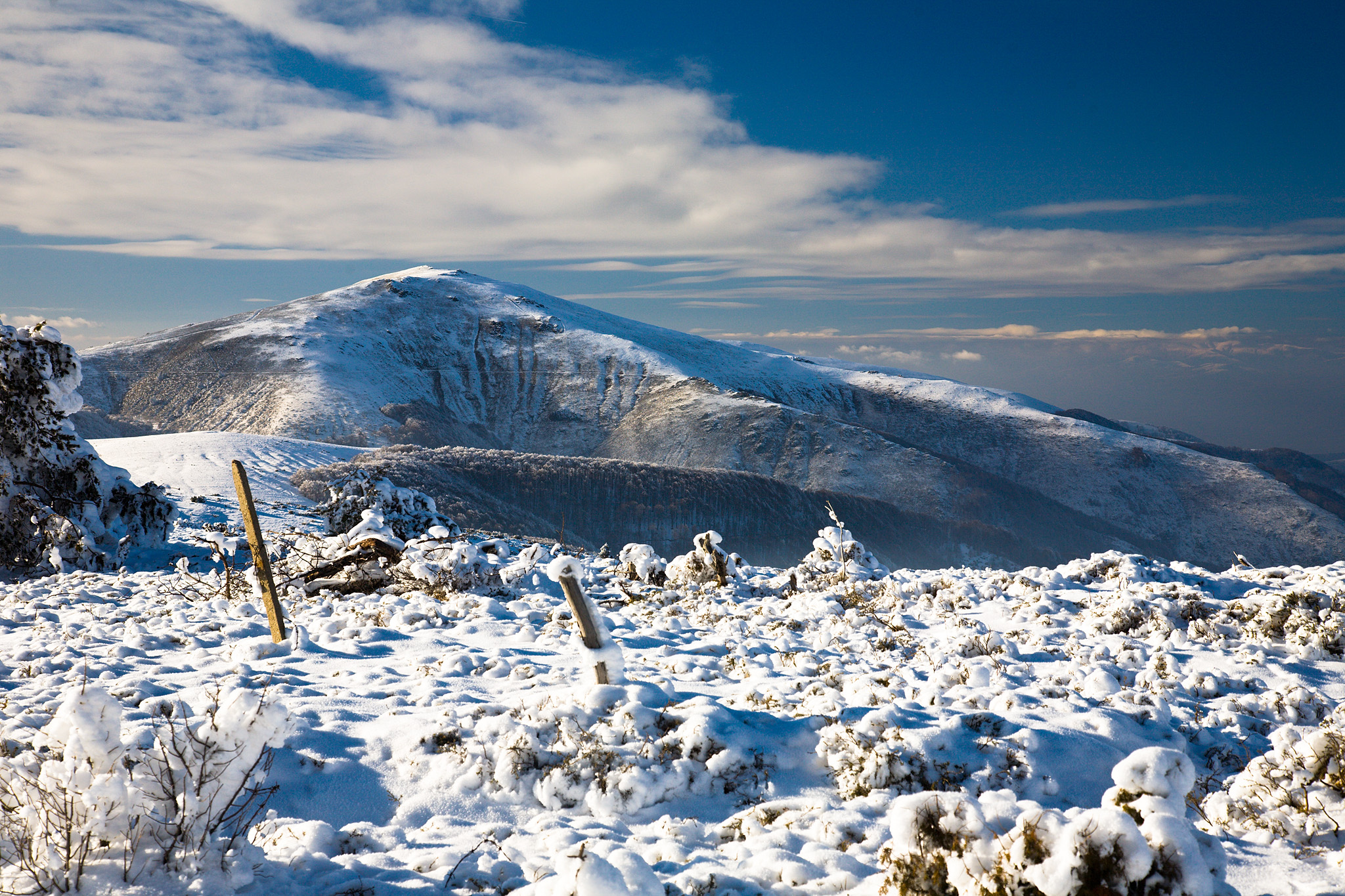
- Ogreyak from Bulgaria

Highest point
- Peak: Ogreyak
- Elevation: 1,924 m (6,312 ft)

Naming
- Native name: Влахина (Bulgarian); Влаина (Macedonian)

Geography
- Countries: Bulgaria and North Macedonia
- Range coordinates: 41°51′N 22°55′E

Vlahina (Bulgarian: Влахина) or Vlaina (Macedonian: Влаина), meaning "Vlach Mountain" is a mountain range on the border of southwestern Bulgaria and eastern North Macedonia. The highest peak is Ogreyak, also known as Kadiytsa, at 1,924 m. Nearby towns include Simitli to the northeast in Bulgaria and Pehčevo to the southwest in North Macedonia.

== Geography ==
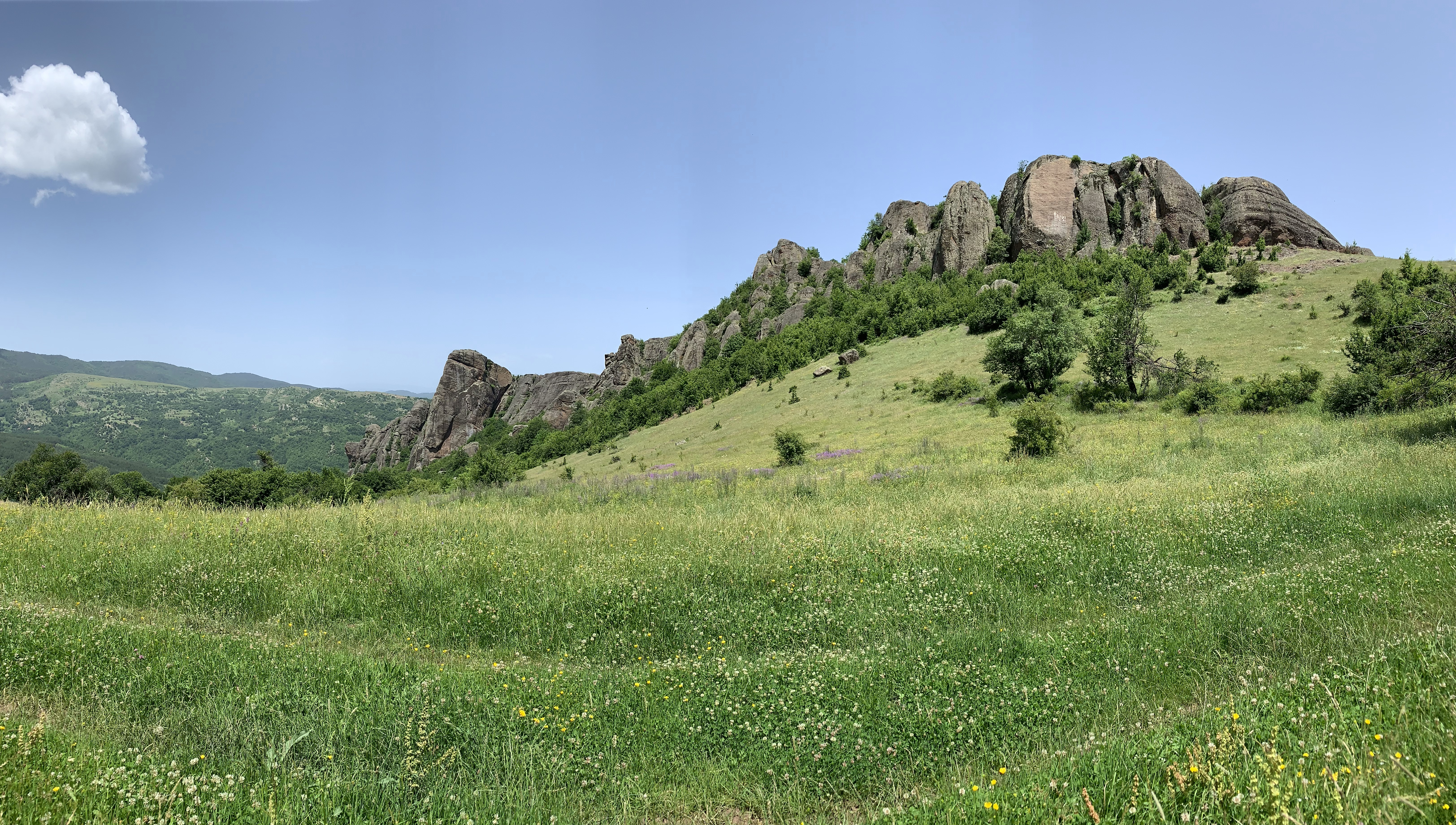
Komatinski Rocks, Bulgaria

Vlahina is situated between the valley of the river Struma to the east that separate it from the mountain ranges of Rila and Pirin in Bulgaria, and the valley of the river Bregalnica to the west that separate it from Golak and Plačkovica in North Macedonia. To the northwest, entirely in Bulgarian territory, the valley of the Eleshnitsa, a right tributary of the Struma, and the Chernata Skala Saddle (930 m) form the connection with Osogovo, to the north the Skrino Gorge along the Struma separates it from Konyavska Planina, to the south the valley of the Sushichka reka and the Sedloto Saddle (1,619 m) link it to Maleshevo Mountain. Its northernmost part between the Eleshnitsa and the Struma is known as the Ruen Mountain. Within these boundaries Vlahina reaches a length of about 50 km in direction north–south, and the width varies between 12 km to the north and 30 km to the south.

The northern part of the main ridge is in Bulgaria; the middle and southern section forms the Bulgaria–North Macedonia border. The ridge is generally flat, with gentler eastern slopes and steeper western ones. The highest summit is Ogreyak (1,924 m), which rises in the southernmost part of Vlahina near the Sedloto Saddle. It is built up mainly of cracked metamorphic rocks — gneiss and amphibolites — but also of diorite, granite gneiss, limestone, marl and others. North of the Bulgarian village of Brestovo is the little known rock formation Komatinski Rocks.

The climate is transitional continental and alpine. The eastern slopes are drained by right tributaries of the Struma, such as Kopriven, Logodashka reka, Stara reka and others, while the western ones are drained by several left tributaries of the Bregalnica. The predominant soils are cinnamon forest soils. Most of the slopes up to 700–800 m are covered with deciduous forests of oaks, ashes, maples and hornbeams, as well as xerophyte bushes and grass associations. The higher areas are forested with beeches.

== Settlements and transport ==
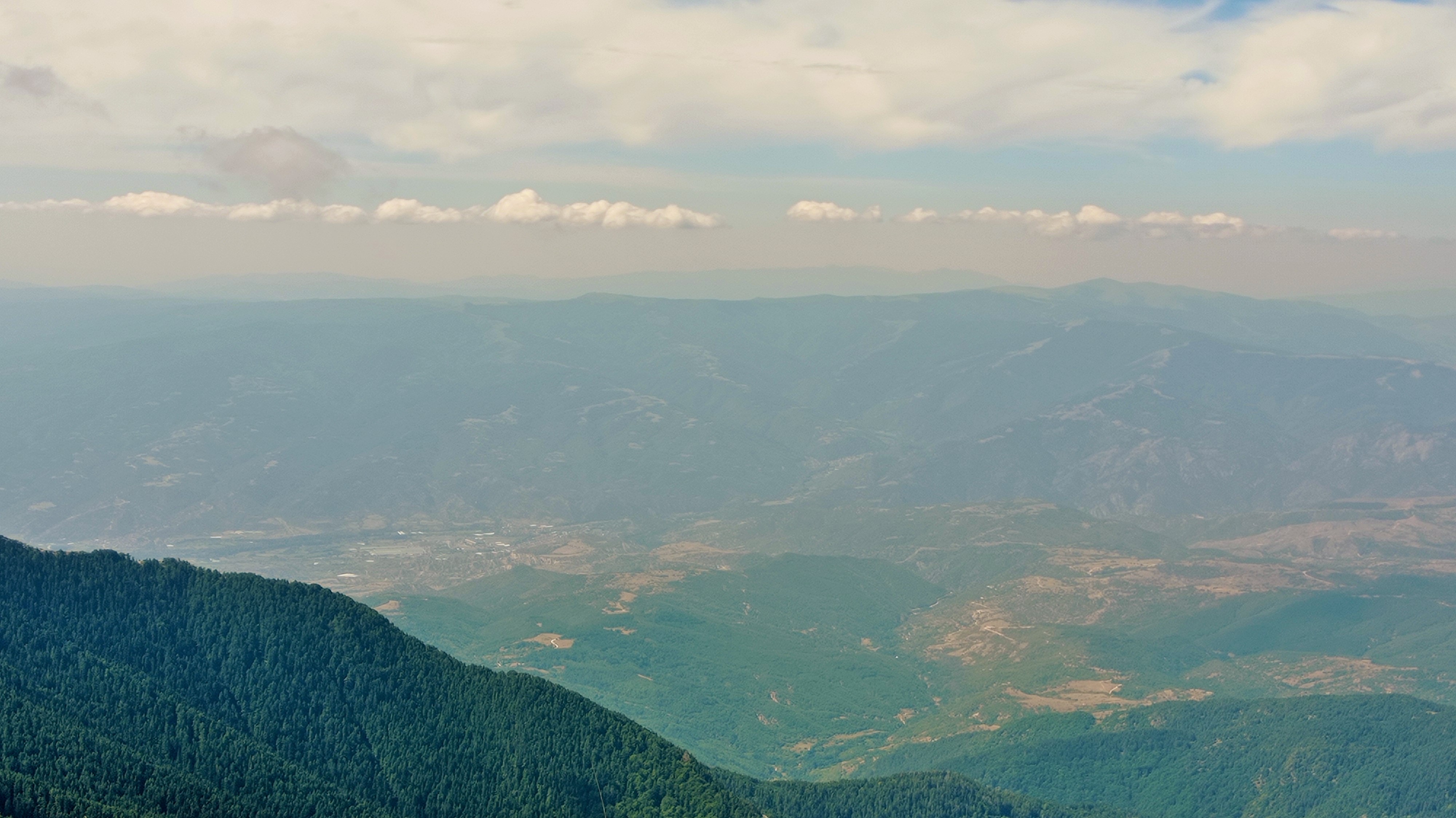
Vlahina, Maleshevo and Kresna Gorge seen from the summit of Sinanitsa in Pirin

Administratively, Vlahina is part of Blagoevgrad and Kyustendil Provinces in Bulgaria, as well as Delčevo, Berovo and Pehčevo Municipalities in North Macedonia. In Bulgaria are located two towns and 33 villages — Brestovo, Buchino, Balgarchevo, Gabrovo, Debochitsa, Dokatichevo, Drenkovo, Zheleznitsa, Zelenodol, Klisura, Leshko, Lisiya, Logodazh, Moshtanets, Obel, Padesh, Pokrovnik, Selishte, Simitli (town), Suhostrel and Troskovo in Blagoevgrad Province, and Boboshevo (town), Borovets, Buranovo, Vaksevo, Dobrovo, Dragodan, Drumohar, Krumovo, Pastuh, Skrino, Frolosh, Tsarvaritsa, Tsarkvishte and Chetirtsi in Kyustendil Province. In North Macedonia are two towns and 15 villages — Virče, Gabrovo, Grad, Delčevo (town), Dzvegor, Negrevo, Nov Istevnik, Pančarevo, Pehčevo (town), Robovo, Smojmirovo, Stamer, Star Istvenik, Trabotivište, Umlena, Crnik and Čiflik. There are three monasteries in the Bulgarian part — the Monastery of Saint John of Rila near Skrino, the Boboshevo Monastery near the homonymous town, and the Troskovo Monastery further south.

There are three roads from the national network of Bulgaria in Vlahina. Along its northern foothills through the Skrino Gorge between Boboshevo and Chetirtsi runs a 24.1 km stretch of the third class III-104 road; through its central part in direction east-west between Zelenodol and the border is a 23 km section of the third class III-106 road' along the northwestern foothills following the river valleys of the Eleshnitsa and Rechitsa runs a 27.7 km stretch of the third class III-622 road.

== Gallery ==
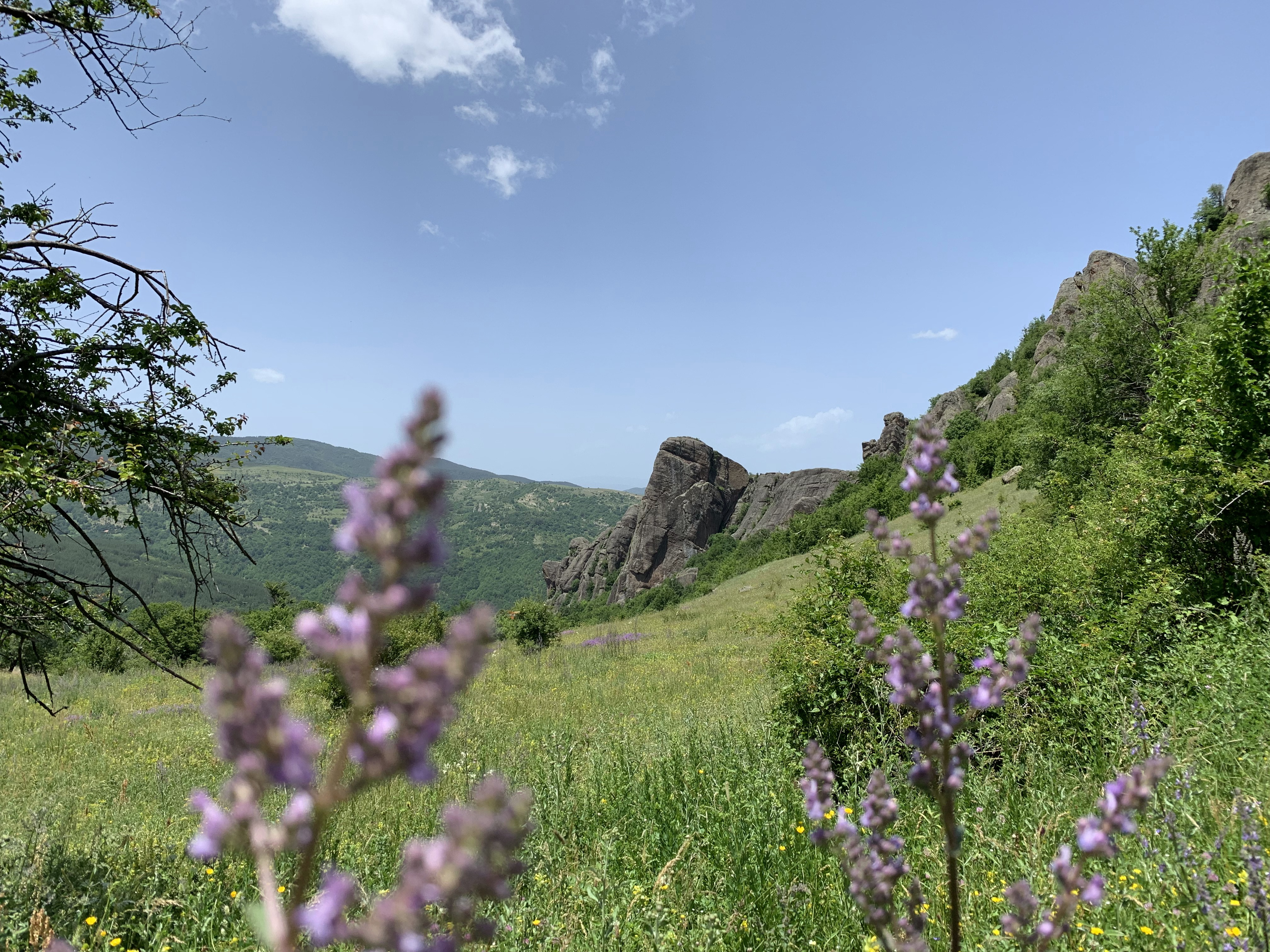
Nature near Komatinski Rocks, Bulgaria

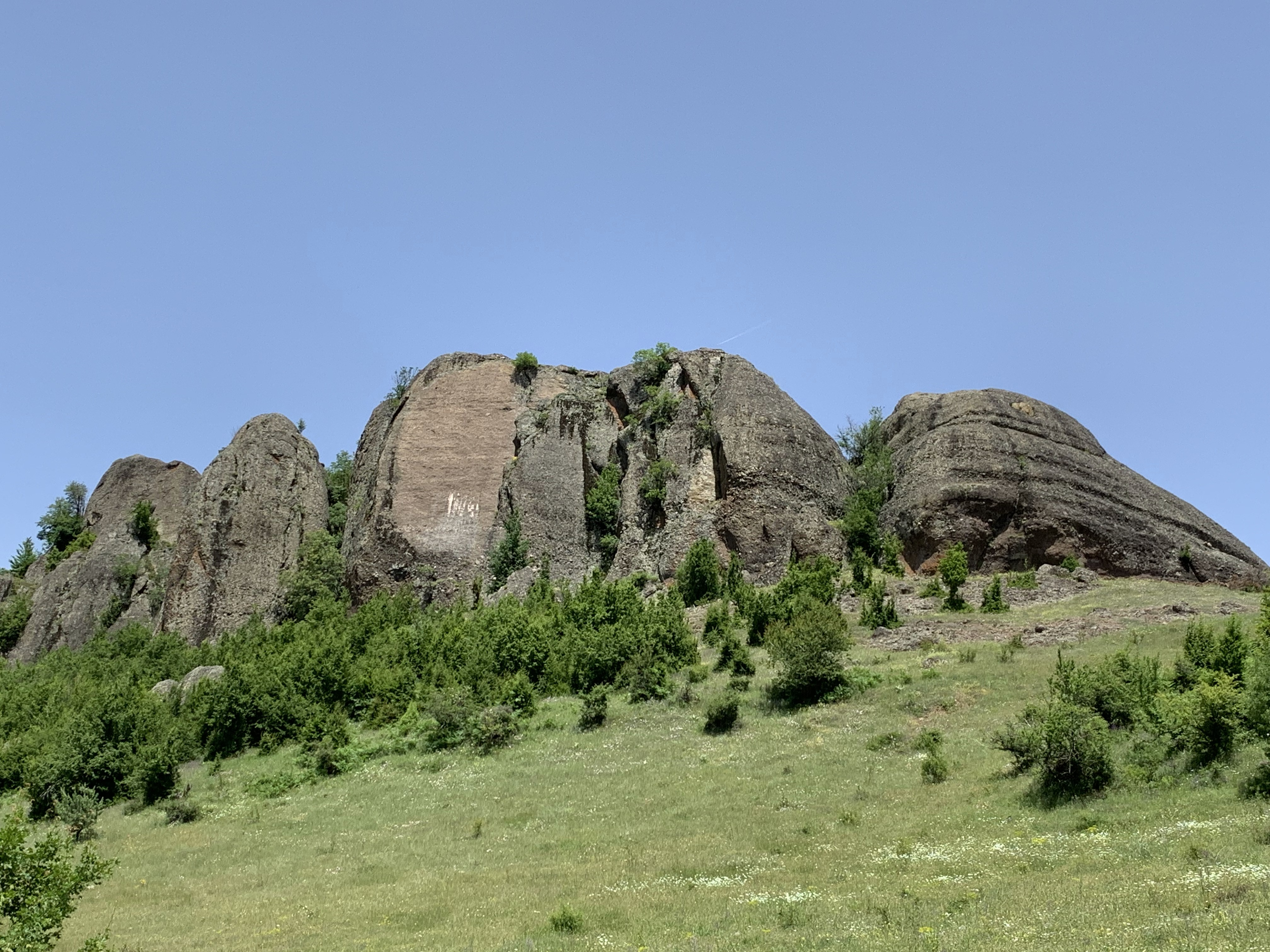
Komatinski Rocks, Bulgaria

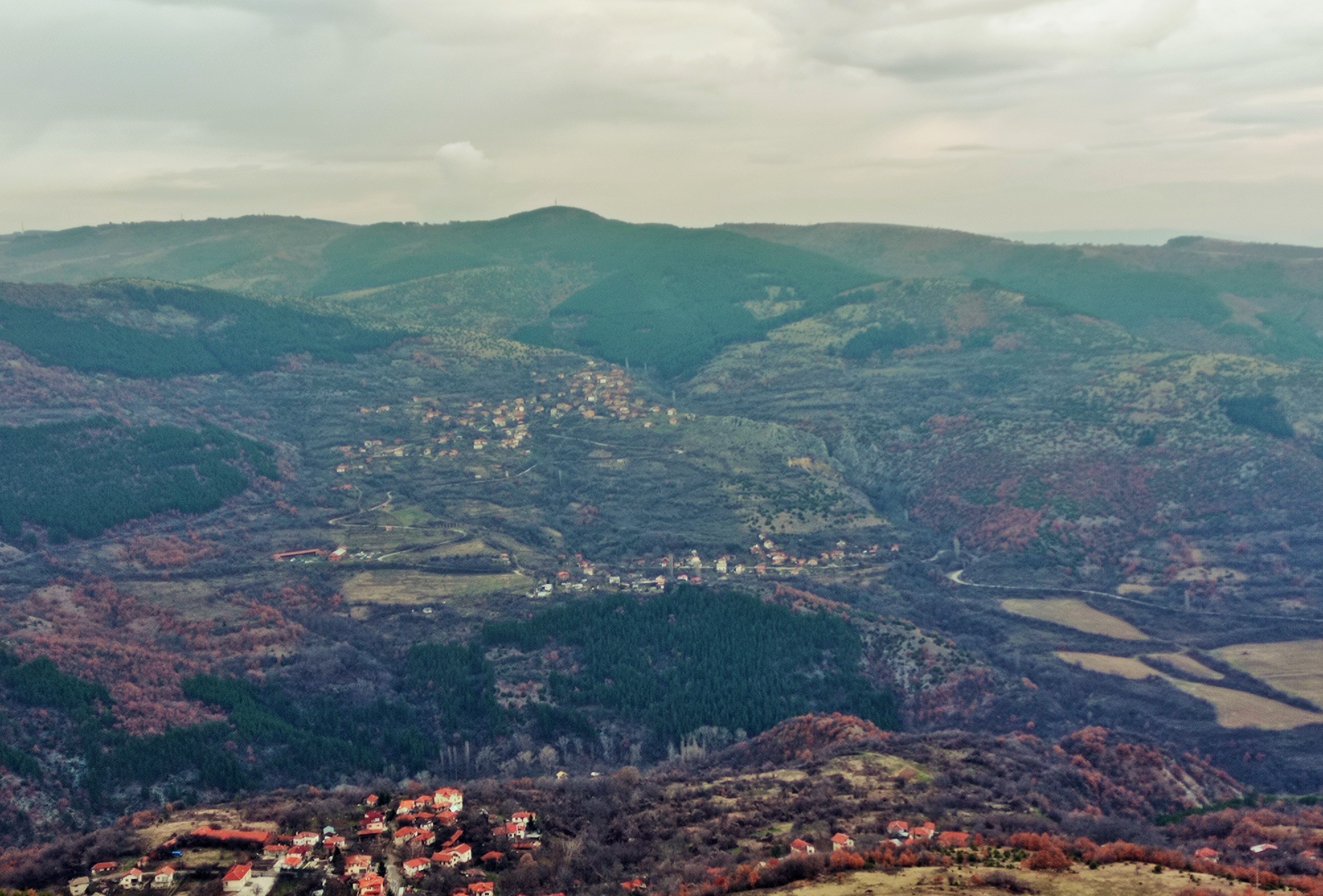
The northern part near Skrino, Bulgaria

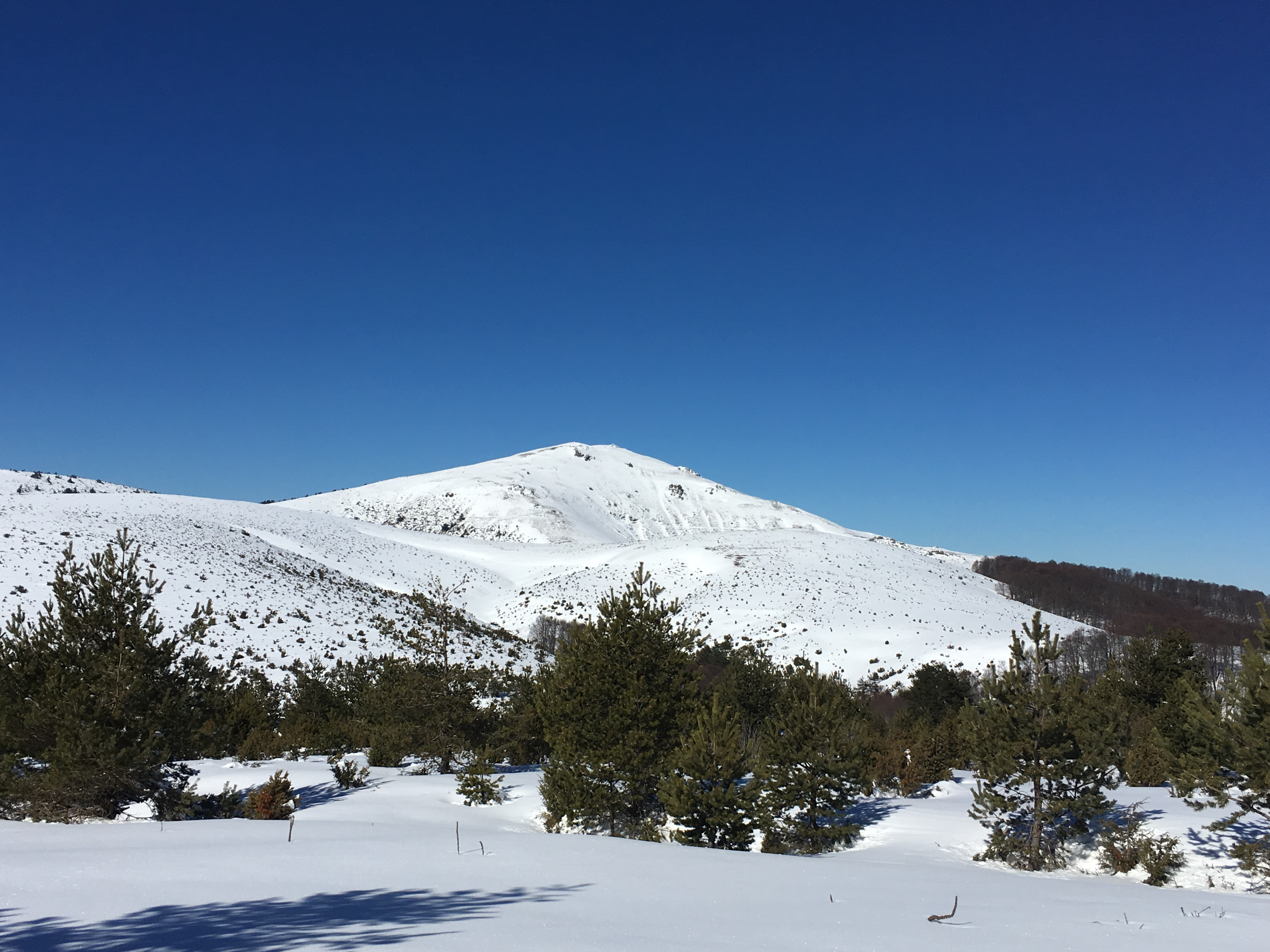
Ogreyak seen from North Macedonia
