= Marulevo =

Marulevo Марулево
- Village
- Location within Bulgaria
- Coordinates: 41°59′N 23°9′E
- Country: Bulgaria
- Province: Blagoevgrad Province
- Municipality: Blagoevgrad

Government
  - Mayor: Alexander Parashkanski (GERB)

Area
  - Total: 25.96 km^{2} (10.02 sq mi)
- Elevation: 750 m (2,460 ft)

Population (15 December 2010)
  - Total: 53
- GRAO
- Time zone: UTC+2 (EET)
  - Summer (DST): UTC+3 (EEST)
- Postal Code: 2725
- Area code: 073

Marulevo is a village in Blagoevgrad Municipality, in Blagoevgrad Province, Bulgaria. It is situated in the foothills of Rila mountain 8 kilometers east of Blagoevgrad. The village is sparsely populated and composed of several isolated and almost abandoned neighborhoods. Once a vivid village in 1860 people built a church and founded an elementary school, later elevated to a primary school. In 1973 the school was closed due to the decreased number of students.
