= Tsarvishte =

Tsarvishte Цървище
- Village
- Location within Bulgaria
- Coordinates: 42°9′N 22°59′E
- Country: Bulgaria
- Province: Kyustendil Province
- Municipality: Kocherinovo

Area
  - Total: 22.218 km^{2} (8.578 sq mi)
- Elevation: 451 m (1,480 ft)

Population (2013)
  - Total: 64
- Time zone: UTC+2 (EET)
  - Summer (DST): UTC+3 (EEST)
- Postal code: 2624

Tsarvishte (Bulgarian: Цървище) is a village in Kocherinovo Municipality, Kyustendil Province, south-western Bulgaria. As of 2013 it has 64 inhabitants. It is situated in the northern section of the Vlahina mountain range close to the town of Boboshevo to the north-west.
