= Gabrovo, Blagoevgrad Province =

Gabrovo Габрово
- Village
- Location within Bulgaria
- Coordinates: 41°54′N 22°56′E
- Country: Bulgaria
- Province: Blagoevgrad Province
- Municipality: Blagoevgrad

Government
  - Suffragan Mayor: Dobrin Hambardjiyski

Area
  - Total: 24,261 km^{2} (9,367 sq mi)
- Elevation: 836 m (2,743 ft)

Population (15 December 2010)
  - Total: 32
- GRAO
- Time zone: UTC+2 (EET)
  - Summer (DST): UTC+3 (EEST)
- Postal Code: 2747
- Area code: 07414

Gabrovo is a very sparsely populated village in Blagoevgrad Municipality, in Blagoevgrad Province, Bulgaria. It is situated on the eastern slope of Vlahina mountain and very close to the border with North Macedonia.
