= Leshko =

Leshko Лешко
- Village
- Location within Bulgaria
- Coordinates: 41°55′N 22°58′E
- Country: Bulgaria
- Province: Blagoevgrad Province
- Municipality: Blagoevgrad

Government
  - Mayor: Galina Velkova (BSP)

Area
  - Total: 43,427 km^{2} (16,767 sq mi)
- Elevation: 591 m (1,939 ft)

Population (15 December 2010)
  - Total: 220
- GRAO
- Time zone: UTC+2 (EET)
  - Summer (DST): UTC+3 (EEST)
- Postal Code: 2749
- Area code: 07414

Leshko is a mountainous village in Blagoevgrad Municipality, in Blagoevgrad Province, Bulgaria. It is situated in the foothills of Vlahina mountain.
