= Frolosh =

Frolosh Фролош
- Village
- Location within Bulgaria
- Coordinates: 42°7′N 22°53′E
- Country: Bulgaria
- Province: Kyustendil Province
- Municipality: Kocherinovo

Area
  - Total: 52.094 km^{2} (20.114 sq mi)
- Elevation: 816 m (2,677 ft)

Population (2013)
  - Total: 120
- Time zone: UTC+2 (EET)
  - Summer (DST): UTC+3 (EEST)
- Postal code: 2682

Frolosh (Bulgarian: Фролош) is a village in Kocherinovo Municipality, Kyustendil Province, south-western Bulgaria. As of 2013 it has 120 inhabitants. It is situated in the picturesque northern section of the Vlahina mountain range with views to Bulgaria's highest mountain range Rila and the village of Mursalevo to the west.

Frolosh Point on the coast of the Anvers Island in Antarctica is named after the village.
