= Lisiya =

Lisiya Лисия
- Village
- Location within Bulgaria
- Coordinates: 42°02′N 22°58′E
- Country: Bulgaria
- Province: Blagoevgrad Province
- Municipality: Blagoevgrad

Government
  - Suffragan Mayor: Krasimir Popovski

Area
  - Total: 25,808 km^{2} (9,965 sq mi)
- Elevation: 641 m (2,103 ft)

Population (15 December 2010)
  - Total: 14
- GRAO
- Time zone: UTC+2 (EET)
  - Summer (DST): UTC+3 (EEST)
- Postal Code: 2743
- Area code: 073

Lisiya is an almost abandoned village in Blagoevgrad Municipality, in Blagoevgrad Province, Bulgaria. It is situated in the foothills of Vlahina mountain. On January 29, 1944, thirteen Bulgarian Partizans died in a battle near the village. Lisiya Ridge on Graham Land, Antarctica is named after the village.
