= Krumovo, Kyustendil Province =

Krumovo Крумово
- Village
- Location within Bulgaria
- Coordinates: 42°4′N 23°1′E
- Country: Bulgaria
- Province: Kyustendil Province
- Municipality: Kocherinovo

Area
  - Total: 9.721 km^{2} (3.753 sq mi)
- Elevation: 361 m (1,184 ft)

Population (2013)
  - Total: 63
- Time zone: UTC+2 (EET)
  - Summer (DST): UTC+3 (EEST)
- Postal code: 2627

Krumovo (Bulgarian: Крумово) is a village in Kocherinovo Municipality, Kyustendil Province, south-western Bulgaria. As of 2013 it has 63 inhabitants. It is situated close to the right bank of the Struma River to the south of the village of Buranovo, at some 2 km to the west of the municipal centre Kocherinovo.
