= Debochitsa =

Debochitsa Дебочица
- Village
- Location within Bulgaria
- Coordinates: 41°51′N 22°57′E
- Country: Bulgaria
- Province: Blagoevgrad Province
- Municipality: Blagoevgrad

Government
  - Suffragan Mayor: Dobrin Hambardjiyski

Area
  - Total: 14.955 km^{2} (5.774 sq mi)
- Elevation: 1,067 m (3,501 ft)

Population (2021)
  - Total: 10
- GRAO
- Time zone: UTC+2 (EET)
  - Summer (DST): UTC+3 (EEST)
- Postal Code: 2748
- Area code: 07414

Debochitsa is a very sparsely populated and dispersed village in Blagoevgrad Municipality, in Blagoevgrad Province, Bulgaria. It is an isolated mountainous settlement in Vlahina mountain, bordering with North Macedonia.
