= Dragodan =

Dragodan Драгодан
- Village
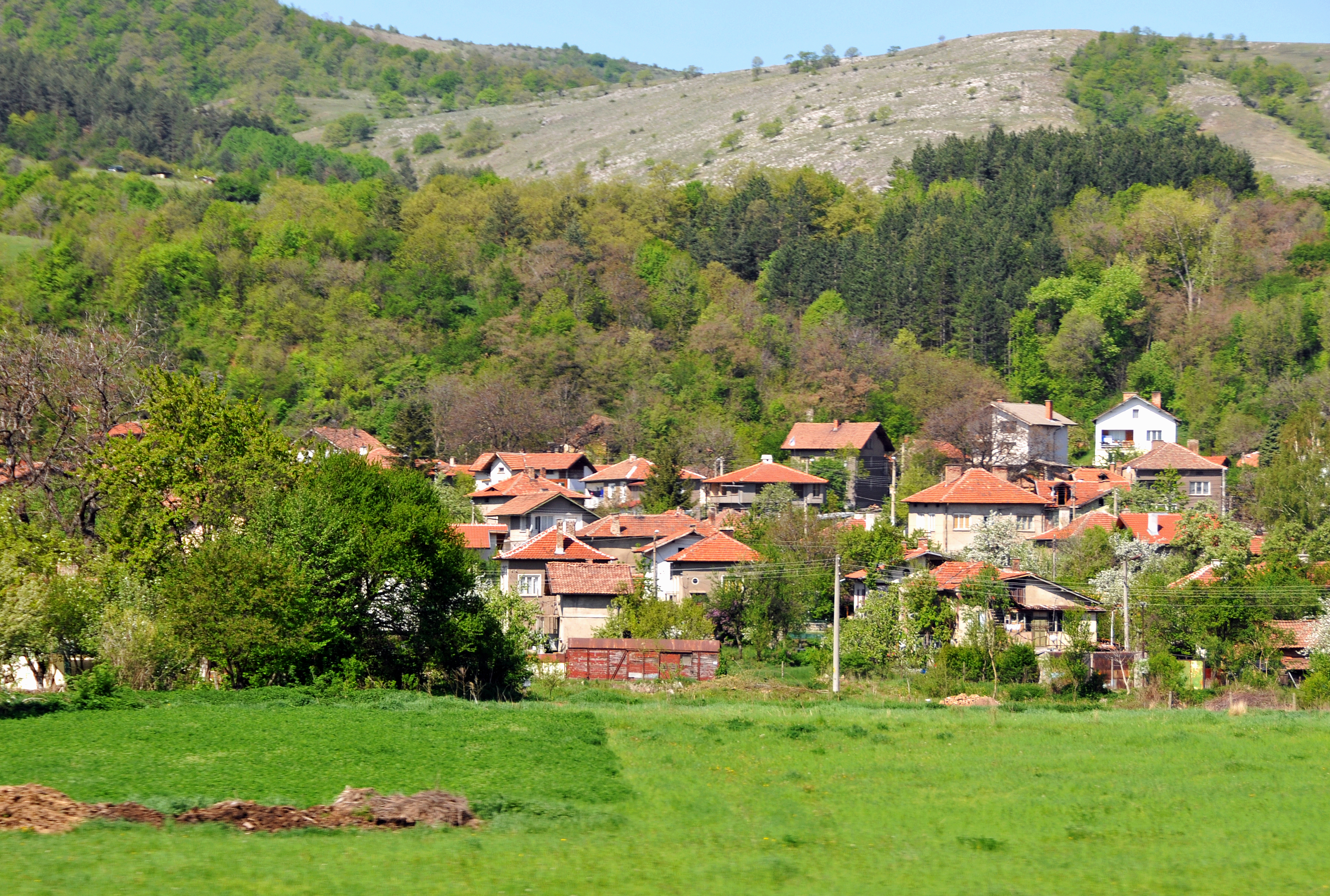

- Location within Bulgaria
- Coordinates: 42°7′N 23°1′E
- Country: Bulgaria
- Province: Kyustendil Province
- Municipality: Kocherinovo

Area
  - Total: 8.733 km^{2} (3.372 sq mi)
- Elevation: 386 m (1,266 ft)

Population (2013)
  - Total: 86
- Time zone: UTC+2 (EET)
  - Summer (DST): UTC+3 (EEST)
- Postal code: 2625

Dragodan (Bulgarian: Драгодан) is a village in Kocherinovo Municipality, Kyustendil Province, south-western Bulgaria. As of 2013 it has 94 inhabitants. It is situated close to the right bank of the Struma River to the north of the village of Borovets, at some 2 km to the north-west of the municipal centre Kocherinovo.

At the outbreak of the First Balkan War in 1912 one person from Dragodan joined the Macedonian-Adrianopolitan Volunteer Corps that was formed in support the Bulgarian war effort against the Ottoman Empire.
