= Gorno Harsovo =

Gorno Harsovo Горно Хърсово
- Village
- Location within Bulgaria
- Coordinates: 42°1′N 23°6′E
- Country: Bulgaria
- Province: Blagoevgrad Province
- Municipality: Blagoevgrad

Government
  - Suffragan Mayor: Ivan Nikolov

Area
  - Total: 26,442 km^{2} (10,209 sq mi)
- Elevation: 560 m (1,840 ft)

Population (15 December 2010)
  - Total: 153
- GRAO
- Time zone: UTC+2 (EET)
  - Summer (DST): UTC+3 (EEST)
- Postal Code: 2727
- Area code: 073

Gorno Harsovo is a village in Blagoevgrad Municipality, in Blagoevgrad Province, Bulgaria. It is situated in Rila mountain 5 kilometers east of Blagoevgrad. There is no electrical power in parts of the village yet.
