= Drenkovo =

Drenkovo Дренково
- Village
- Location within Bulgaria
- Coordinates: 42°01′N 22°55′E
- Country: Bulgaria
- Province: Blagoevgrad Province
- Municipality: Blagoevgrad

Government
  - Suffragan Mayor: Kiril Ivanovski

Area
  - Total: 24.517 km^{2} (9.466 sq mi)
- Elevation: 832 m (2,730 ft)

Population (15 December 2010)
  - Total: 62
- GRAO
- Time zone: UTC+2 (EET)
  - Summer (DST): UTC+3 (EEST)
- Postal Code: 2739
- Area code: 07413

Drenkovo (Bulgarian: Дренково) is a sparsely populated and dispersed village in Blagoevgrad Municipality, in Blagoevgrad Province, Bulgaria. It is situated in the foothills of Vlahina mountain few kilometers west of Blagoevgrad and north from the road to North Macedonia. There are ruins of Roman villa near the village.
