= Elenovo, Blagoevgrad Province =

Elenovo Еленово
- Village
- Location within Bulgaria
- Coordinates: 42°1′N 23°6′E
- Country: Bulgaria
- Province: Blagoevgrad Province
- Municipality: Blagoevgrad

Government
  - Mayor: Borislav Stoynev (NFSB)

Area
  - Total: 3.878 km^{2} (1.497 sq mi)
- Elevation: 561 m (1,841 ft)

Population (7 September 2021)
  - Total: 272
- GRAO
- Time zone: UTC+2 (EET)
  - Summer (DST): UTC+3 (EEST)
- Postal Code: 2726
- Area code: 073

Elenovo is a village in Blagoevgrad Municipality, in Blagoevgrad Province, Bulgaria. It is situated in the foothills of Rila mountain and a kilometer east of Blagoevgrad.
