= Klisura, Blagoevgrad Province =

Klisura Клисура
- Village
- Location within Bulgaria
- Coordinates: 42°1′N 22°55′E
- Country: Bulgaria
- Province: Blagoevgrad Province
- Municipality: Blagoevgrad

Government
  - Suffragan Mayor: Kiril Ivanovski

Area
  - Total: 19.136 km^{2} (7.388 sq mi)
- Elevation: 990 m (3,250 ft)

Population (15 December 2010)
  - Total: 27
- GRAO
- Time zone: UTC+2 (EET)
  - Summer (DST): UTC+3 (EEST)
- Postal Code: 2738
- Area code: 07413

Klisura is a sparsely populated and dispersed, composed of several almost abandoned neighborhoods village in Blagoevgrad Municipality, in Blagoevgrad Province, Bulgaria. It is situated in the Vlahina mountain, bordering with North Macedonia to the west and Kyustendil Province to the north. The area is covered with oak and beech forests. There are remains of prehistorical village nearby.
