= Obel, Bulgaria =

Obel Обел
- Village
- Location within Bulgaria
- Coordinates: 41°57′N 22°54′E
- Country: Bulgaria
- Province: Blagoevgrad Province
- Municipality: Blagoevgrad

Government
  - Suffragan Mayor: Kiril Ivanovski

Area
  - Total: 16,747 km^{2} (6,466 sq mi)
- Elevation: 1,050 m (3,440 ft)

Population (15December 2010)
  - Total: 45
- GRAO
- Time zone: UTC+2 (EET)
  - Summer (DST): UTC+3 (EEST)
- Postal Code: 2738
- Area code: 07415

Obel is a small village in Blagoevgrad Municipality, in Blagoevgrad Province, Bulgaria. It is a mountainous settlement in Vlahina mountain, bordering with North Macedonia. Obel is the last settlement before the border crossing "Stanke Lisichkovo" on the road from Blagoevgrad to Delčevo.
