= Buranovo, Bulgaria =

Buranovo Бураново
- Village
- Location within Bulgaria
- Coordinates: 42°6′N 23°0′E
- Country: Bulgaria
- Province: Kyustendil Province
- Municipality: Kocherinovo

Area
  - Total: 10.898 km^{2} (4.208 sq mi)
- Elevation: 397 m (1,302 ft)

Population (2013)
  - Total: 152
- Time zone: UTC+2 (EET)
  - Summer (DST): UTC+3 (EEST)
- Postal code: 2628

Buranovo (Bulgarian: Бураново) is a village in Kocherinovo Municipality, Kyustendil Province, south-western Bulgaria. As of 2013 it has 152 inhabitants. It is situated close to the right bank of the Struma River just south of the village of Borovets, at some 2 km to the north-west of the municipal centre Kocherinovo.

At the outbreak of the First Balkan War in 1912 two people from Buranovo joined the Macedonian-Adrianopolitan Volunteer Corps that was formed in support the Bulgarian war effort against the Ottoman Empire.
