= Barakovo, Bulgaria =

Barakovo Бараково
- Village
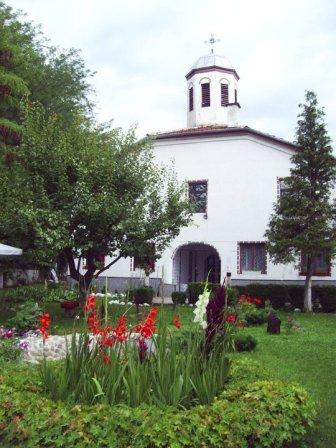

- Location within Bulgaria
- Coordinates: 42°4′1″N 23°4′1″E
- Country: Bulgaria
- Province: Kyustendil Province
- Municipality: Kocherinovo

Area
  - Total: 7.979 km^{2} (3.081 sq mi)
- Elevation: 384 m (1,260 ft)

Population (2013)
  - Total: 468
- Time zone: UTC+2 (EET)
  - Summer (DST): UTC+3 (EEST)
- Postal code: 2634

Barakovo (Bulgarian: Бараково) is a village in Kocherinovo Municipality, Kyustendil Province of southwest Bulgaria. As of 2013, it had a population of 468. It is situated at the western foothills of the Rila Mountains on the banks of the Rilska River. Between 1974 and 1991 it was administratively a neighbourhood of the town of Kocherinovo.

After the Liberation of Bulgaria in 1878 the village remained within the Ottoman Empire on the very border with the Principality of Bulgaria. The population supported the Bulgarian Internal Macedonian Revolutionary Organization. At the outbreak of the First Balkan War in 1912 seven people from Barakovo joined the Macedonian-Adrianopolitan Volunteer Corps that was formed in support the Bulgarian war effort against the Ottomans.

In 1903 the entrepreneur Todor Balabanov founded a timber factory in the village that after the liberation of Barakovo in 1912 employed between 500 and 1000 people. The factory grew to have its own power station, clinic, school, cinema and casino. In the 1930s the prominent Bulgarian poet Nikola Vaptsarov worked there.
