= Belo Polje =

Belo Polje (Serbian Cyrillic: Бело Поље) is a Serbian place name, meaning "white field". It may refer to:

== Kosovo ==
- Belo Polje (Peć), a village in Peć, Kosovo

== Serbia ==
- Belo Polje (Surdulica), an industrial settlement on the approach to Surdulic and now part of the town of Surdulica
- Belo Polje (Obrenovac), a village in municipality of Obrenovac
- Belo Polje (Brus), a village in municipality of Brus
- Belo Polje (Gornji Milanovac), a village in municipality of Gornji Milanovac
- Belo Polje (Kuršumlija), a village in municipality of Kuršumlija
- Belo Polje (Raška), a village in municipality of Raška

== See also ==
- Bijelo Polje, a town and municipality in northern Montenegro
- Belo Pole (disambiguation)
