= Buchino =

Buchino Бучино
- Village
- Location within Bulgaria
- Coordinates: 42°3′N 23°0′E
- Country: Bulgaria
- Province: Blagoevgrad Province
- Municipality: Blagoevgrad

Government
  - Suffragan Mayor: Zhivko Chukarski

Area
  - Total: 15.929 km^{2} (6.150 sq mi)
- Elevation: 577 m (1,893 ft)

Population (31-12-2020)
  - Total: 61
- Time zone: UTC+2 (EET)
  - Summer (DST): UTC+3 (EEST)
- Postal Code: 2724
- Area code: 073
- Climate: Cfb

Buchino is a sparsely inhabited village in Blagoevgrad Municipality, in Blagoevgrad Province, Bulgaria. It is situated on the foothills of Vlahina mountain 13 kilometers northwest of Blagoevgrad.

== History ==
In 1891 Georgi Strezov wrote about the village:

"Buchino, 3 hours from Jumaya, towards the border, is surrounded by small forest, which is well preserved, because it was said anyone who dared to cut down a branch of this forest died. 75 houses, 360 Bulgarians and 75 Turks."

At the outbreak of the Balkan War in 1912, two people from Buchino were volunteers in the Macedonian-Edirne militia.

== Population ==
By 1900, according to the famous statistics of Vasil Kanchov ("Macedonia. Ethnography and Statistics"), the population of Buchino (Bair Koi) numbered 517 people, of whom 442 were Bulgarian Christians and 75 Turks.

Population by census over the years:

Historical population

Year	Pop.	±%
1934	708	—
1946	764	+7.9%
1956	721	−5.6%
1965	567	−21.4%
1975	272	−52.0%

Year	Pop.	±%
1985	200	−26.5%
1992	177	−11.5%
2001	134	−24.3%
2011	88	−34.3%
2021	58	−34.1%

Source: NSI
