= Zelenodol =

Zelen dol Зелен дол
- Village
- Location within Bulgaria
- Coordinates: 42°0′N 23°2′E
- Country: Bulgaria
- Province: Blagoevgrad Province
- Municipality: Blagoevgrad

Government
  - Suffragan Mayor: Aleksandar Manovski

Area
  - Total: 7.044 km^{2} (2.720 sq mi)
- Elevation: 480 m (1,570 ft)

Population (15 December 2010)
  - Total: 234
- GRAO
- Time zone: UTC+2 (EET)
  - Summer (DST): UTC+3 (EEST)
- Postal Code: 2745
- Area code: 07415

Zelen dol is a village in Blagoevgrad Municipality, Blagoevgrad Province, Bulgaria. It is situated on the right bank of Struma river 5 kilometers west from Blagoevgrad on the road to Delčevo in North Macedonia.
