= Balgarchevo =

Balgarchevo Българчево
- Village
- Location within Bulgaria
- Coordinates: 42°2′N 23°1′E
- Country: Bulgaria
- Province: Blagoevgrad Province
- Municipality: Blagoevgrad

Government
  - Mayor: Elena Stoycheva (BSP)

Area
  - Total: 12.072 km^{2} (4.661 sq mi)
- Elevation: 350 m (1,150 ft)

Population (2021)
  - Total: 368
- GRAO
- Time zone: UTC+2 (EET)
  - Summer (DST): UTC+3 (EEST)
- Postal Code: 2746
- Area code: 07415

Balgarchevo is a village in Blagoevgrad Municipality, in Blagoevgrad Province, Bulgaria on the right bank of the Struma river 5 kilometers northwest of Blagoevgrad.
