= Karl Novelich =

Croatian-Bulgarian voivode, mayor and murderer

Karl Novelich (1852 - 1897), also known as Karlo or Dragutin Novelich, was a Bulgarian voivode during the Kresna–Razlog uprising, mayor of Plovdiv and participant in the murder of Anna Simon, one of the most infamous affairs during the late 1890s Bulgaria.

== Biography ==
Novelich's early life is enigmatic - he claimed that he born in 1852 in Vicenza, was of Croatian extraction, and that he fought alongside Giuseppe Garibaldi. According to others, he might've originated from Piedmont or Friuli.

When the Kresna–Razlog uprising blew up, under the name of Dragutin Novelich, he led a detachment which, along with those of Georgi Karaiskaki, Pavle Yankov, Grigor Ognenov, Stefo Nikolov, Georgi Pulevski, Kosta Nikolov, Nikolitsa Makedonski, Georgi Oko and Konstantin Plevakov, invaded Macedonia.

Dragutin Novelich's Detachment No.10, Padesh, March 20, 1879
| Number | Name | Age | District | Settlement |
|---|---|---|---|---|
| 1. | Petar Radovich | 22 | | Pavlica |
| 2. | Yordan Dimitriev | 21 | | Kriva Palanka |
| 3. | Petar Stoyanov | 28 | | Gabrovo |
| 4. | Anto Mitov | 21 | Kriva Palanka | Duracka Reka |
| 5. | Stefan Atanasov | 25 | | Prizren |
| 6. | Petar Stefanov | 25 | | Kičevo |
| 7. | Yanko Tanasov | 22 | Debar | |
| 8. | Risto Petrov | 24 | | Vranje |
| 9. | Stefan Trifunov | 24 | | Debar |
| 10. | Arso Boychinov | 22 | | Kočani |
| 11. | Atanas Yachov | 20 | Kriva Palanka | Konopnica |
| 12. | Stoyan Stankov | 20 | Kyustendil | Lazarevo |
| 13. | Mihajl Traikov | 23 | Thessaloniki | |
| 14. | Stefan Georev | 25 | Skopje | |
| 15. | Yovan Stanoev | 27 | Kriva Palanka | Duracka Reka |
| 16. | Georghe Penkov | 25 | Kostur | |
| 17. | Andon Markov | 25 | | Prizren |
| 18. | Kuzman Yanakiev | 21 | Kostur | |
| 19. | Hristo Tolev | 25 | Thessaloniki | |
| 20. | Ilja Popov | 39 | | Kratovo |

After the uprising, Novelich settled in Plovdiv and eventually became its mayor. In 1897, he helped the palatial adjutant Dechko Boychev in the murder of his lover, the Hungarian prostitute Anna Simon. For this crime, he was sentenced to death and executed.
