= Belo Pole =

Belo Pole can refer to:

- Belo Pole, Blagoevgrad Province, Bulgaria
- Belo Pole, Vidin Province, Bulgaria
- Belo Pole, Dolneni, North Macedonia

== See also ==
- Belo Polje (disambiguation)
- Bijelo Polje, a town and municipality in northern Montenegro
