= Mursalevo =

Mursalevo Мурсалево
- Village
- Location within Bulgaria
- Coordinates: 42°7′N 23°3′E
- Country: Bulgaria
- Province: Kyustendil Province
- Municipality: Kocherinovo

Area
  - Total: 12.447 km^{2} (4.806 sq mi)
- Elevation: 492 m (1,614 ft)

Population (2013)
  - Total: 413
- Time zone: UTC+2 (EET)
  - Summer (DST): UTC+3 (EEST)
- Postal code: 2623

Mursalevo (Bulgarian: Мурсалево) is a village in Kocherinovo Municipality, Kyustendil Province, south-western Bulgaria. As of 2013 it has 413 inhabitants. It is situated on the left bank of the Struma River at about 2 km north of the municipal centre Kocherinovo.

The remains of a Neolithic village, estimated to be 8,000 years old, have been excavated nearby. The foundations of more than 60 houses have been discovered, some of them with two storeys.
