= Buchino Rocks =

Islands in the South Shetland Islands

- Location of Greenwich Island in the South Shetland Islands

- Location within Antarctica Location within Antarctic Peninsula

Geography
- Location: Antarctica
- Coordinates: 62°23′25″S 59°53′13″W
- Archipelago: South Shetland Islands

Administration
- Antarctica
- Administered under the Antarctic Treaty System

Demographics
- Population: uninhabited

Buchino Rocks (Bulgarian: скали Бучино, romanized: Skali Buchino) (ska-'li 'bu-chi-no) is a group of rocks off the north coast of Greenwich Island in the South Shetland Islands, Antarctica situated 1.5 km (0.93 mi) northwest of Stoker Island, 1.6 km (0.99 mi) southeast of Romeo Island and 1.9 km (1.2 mi) north-northwest of Tvarditsa Rocks.

The rocks are named after the settlements of Buchino, and Golemo (Great) Buchino and Malo (Little) Buchino in western Bulgaria.

== Location ==
Buchino Rocks are located at 62°23′25″S 59°53′13″W. Bulgarian mapping in 2009.

== See also ==
- Composite Antarctic Gazetteer
- List of Antarctic islands south of 60° S
- SCAR
- Territorial claims in Antarctica

== Maps ==
L.L. Ivanov. Antarctica: Livingston Island and Greenwich, Robert, Snow and Smith Islands. Scale 1:120000 topographic map. Troyan: Manfred Wörner Foundation, 2009. ISBN 978-954-92032-6-4
