= Moshtanets =

Moshtanets Мощанец
- Village
- Location within Bulgaria
- Coordinates: 41°58′N 23°4′E
- Country: Bulgaria
- Province: Blagoevgrad Province
- Municipality: Blagoevgrad

Government
  - Suffragan Mayor: Mladen Nikolov

Area
  - Total: 4,872 km^{2} (1,881 sq mi)
- Elevation: 501 m (1,644 ft)

Population (15 December 2010)
  - Total: 59
- GRAO
- Time zone: UTC+2 (EET)
  - Summer (DST): UTC+3 (EEST)
- Postal Code: 2729
- Area code: 073

Moshtanets is a village in Blagoevgrad Municipality, in Blagoevgrad Province, Bulgaria. It is situated on the right bank of Struma river southwest of Blagoevgrad.
