= Logodazh =

Logodazh Логодаж
- Village
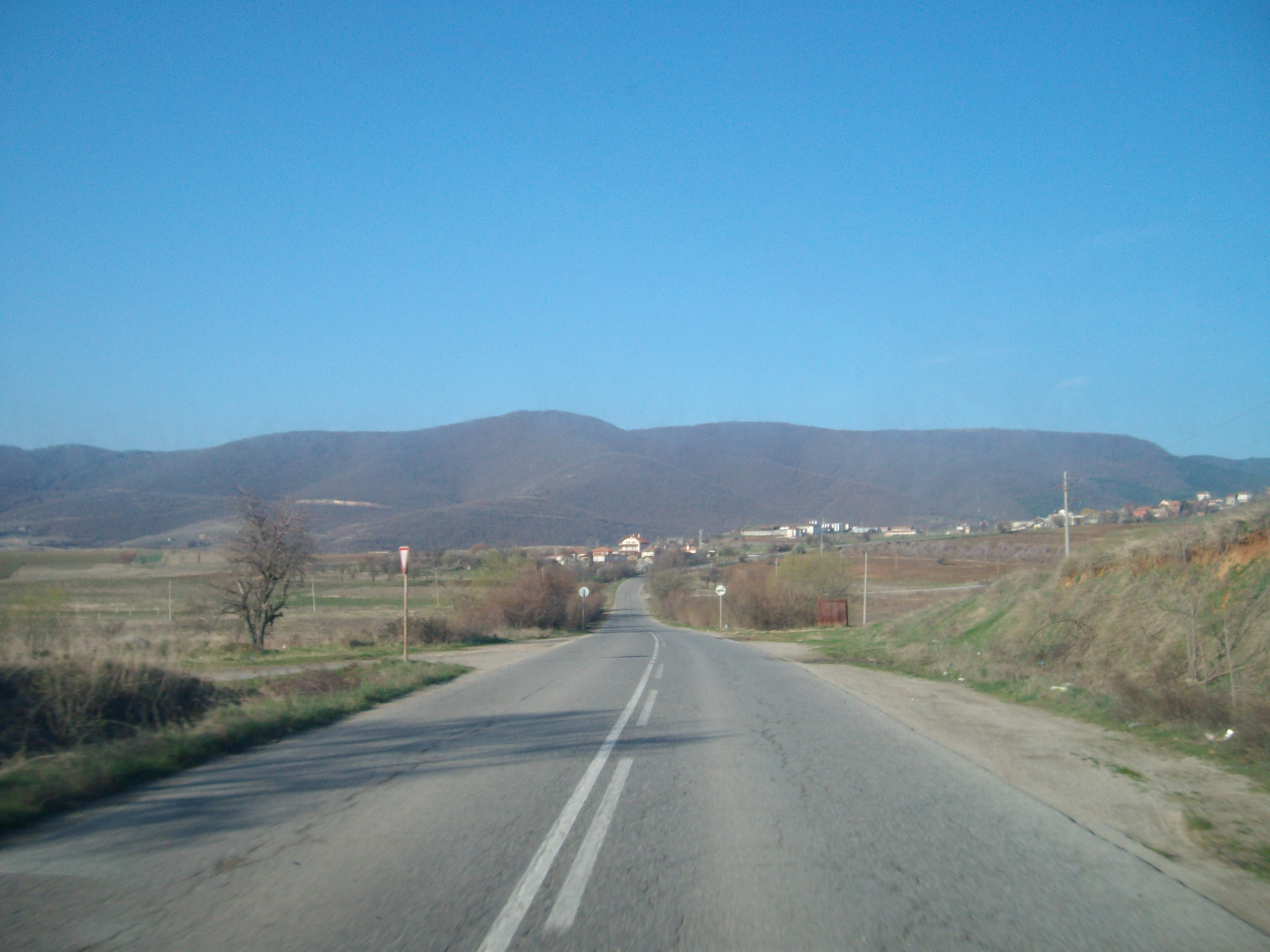
- Logodazh

- Location within Bulgaria
- Coordinates: 41°59′N 22°56′E
- Country: Bulgaria
- Province: Blagoevgrad Province
- Municipality: Blagoevgrad

Government
  - Mayor: Plamen Chervenkov (BSP)

Area
  - Total: 31,155 km^{2} (12,029 sq mi)
- Elevation: 628 m (2,060 ft)

Population (15 December 2010)
  - Total: 303
- GRAO
- Time zone: UTC+2 (EET)
  - Summer (DST): UTC+3 (EEST)
- Postal Code: 2737
- Area code: 07415

Logodazh is a village in Blagoevgrad Municipality, in Blagoevgrad Province, Bulgaria. It is situated in the foothills of Vlahina mountain on the road between Blagoevgrad and Delčevo, North Macedonia. Between 1959 and 1993 the village was named Stanke Lisichkovo to a partizan from the village. There is a winery "Vinprom Logodazh" with vineyards working in Logodazh.
