= Padesh =

Padesh Падеш
- Village
- Location within Bulgaria
- Coordinates: 41°55′N 23°00′E
- Country: Bulgaria
- Province: Blagoevgrad Province
- Municipality: Blagoevgrad

Government
  - Mayor: Valeri Kachulski (Union of Democratic Forces (Bulgaria))

Area
  - Total: 35,852 km^{2} (13,843 sq mi)
- Elevation: 700 m (2,300 ft)

Population (15 December 2010)
  - Total: 639
- GRAO
- Time zone: UTC+2 (EET)
  - Summer (DST): UTC+3 (EEST)
- Postal Code: 2747
- Area code: 07414

Padesh is a village in Blagoevgrad Municipality, in Blagoevgrad Province, Bulgaria. It situated in a valley in the Vlahina foothills 13 kilometers southwest of Blagoevgrad. There is a primary school "Todor Aleksandrov" and a cultural center "Smilen Seimenski" with a public library.

Padesh is the birthplace of the Mayor of Blagoevgrad Atanas Kambitov (GERB).
