= Selishte, Blagoevgrad Province =

Selishte Селище
- Village
- Location within Bulgaria
- Coordinates: 42°0′N 23°0′E
- Country: Bulgaria
- Province: Blagoevgrad Province
- Municipality: Blagoevgrad

Government
  - Suffragan mayor: Georgi Atanasov

Area
  - Total: 13.94 km^{2} (5.38 sq mi)
- Elevation: 515 m (1,690 ft)

Population (15 December 2010)
  - Total: 415
- GRAO
- Time zone: UTC+2 (EET)
  - Summer (DST): UTC+3 (EEST)
- Postal Code: 2744
- Area code: 07415

Selishte is a village in Blagoevgrad Municipality, in Blagoevgrad Province, Bulgaria. It is situated 11 kilometers west of Blagoevgrad on the road to Delčevo in North Macedonia. The 42nd parallel north and the 23rd meridian east intersect, just outside the village. The intersection is marked with a sign.
