= Belo Pole, Blagoevgrad Province =

Belo pole Бело поле
- Location of Belo pole
- Coordinates: 42°2′0″N 23°2′0″E
- Country: Bulgaria
- Province: Blagoevgrad Province
- Municipality: Blagoevgrad

Government
  - Mayor: Ivan Stoychev (VMRO-BND)

Area
  - Total: 2.584 km^{2} (0.998 sq mi)
- Elevation: 333 m (1,093 ft)

Population (2021)
  - Total: 561
- Time zone: UTC+2 (EET)
  - Summer (DST): UTC+3 (EEST)
- Postal Code: 2709
- Area code: 073
- Climate: Cfa

Belo Pole (Bulgarian: Бело поле) is a small village in southwestern Bulgaria. Administratively it is included in Blagoevgrad Municipality, Blagoevgrad Province.

It is located 4.5 km northwest of Blagoevgrad on the main road E79 and the railway Sofia-Kulata, on the left bank of Struma river. Because of the closeness with Blagoevgrad it is connected with town's communal transport net. Passenger trains stop there too.

== Geography ==
Belo Pole is situated in the valley of the Struma river, on the left coast. The village is near to the administrative centre and it is like suburb of Blagoevgrad.

== History ==
Belo Pole is supposed to be an ancient Roman settlement. Archeologists found coins from Roman Republic. The legends says the first people (or travelling merchants in other version of the legend) come here saw a field with many white flowers. This is the reason the village to be named Belo Pole (In English this means "A White Field").
