= Smojmirovo =

Smojmirovo Смојмирово
- Village
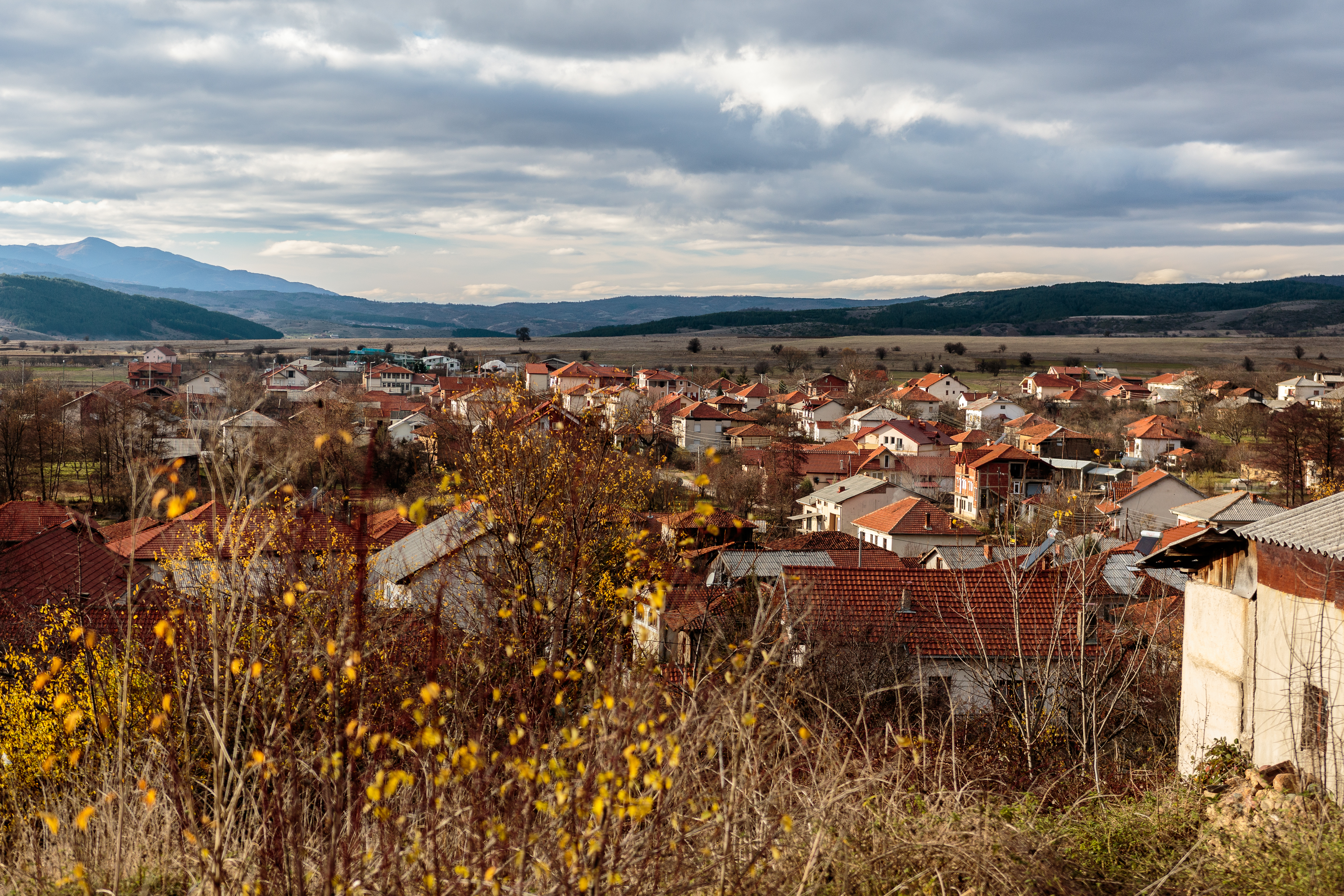
- View of the village Smojmirovo

- Location within North Macedonia
- Country: North Macedonia
- Region: Eastern
- Municipality: Berovo

Population (2002)
  - Total: 765
- Time zone: UTC+1 (CET)

Smojmirovo (Macedonian: Смојмирово) is a village in the Berovo Municipality of North Macedonia.

Smojmirovo's original name (with diacritics) is Smojmirovo. Smijmirovo's distance is 3.6 km/2.24 mi away from the center of the municipality.

== Demographics ==
According to the 2002 census, the village had a total of 765 inhabitants. Ethnic groups in the village include:

- Macedonians 764
- Serbs 1
