= Borovets, Kyustendil Province =

Borovets Боровец
- Village
- Location within Bulgaria
- Coordinates: 42°7′N 23°0′E
- Country: Bulgaria
- Province: Kyustendil Province
- Municipality: Kocherinovo

Area
  - Total: 5.946 km^{2} (2.296 sq mi)
- Elevation: 446 m (1,463 ft)

Population (2013)
  - Total: 94
- Time zone: UTC+2 (EET)
  - Summer (DST): UTC+3 (EEST)
- Postal code: 2626

Borovets (Bulgarian: Боровец) is a village in Kocherinovo Municipality, Kyustendil Province, south-western Bulgaria. As of 2013, it had 94 inhabitants. It is situated close to the right bank of the Struma River at 2 km to the north-west of the municipal centre Kocherinovo.
