= Kocherinovo =

Kocherinovo Кочериново
- Town
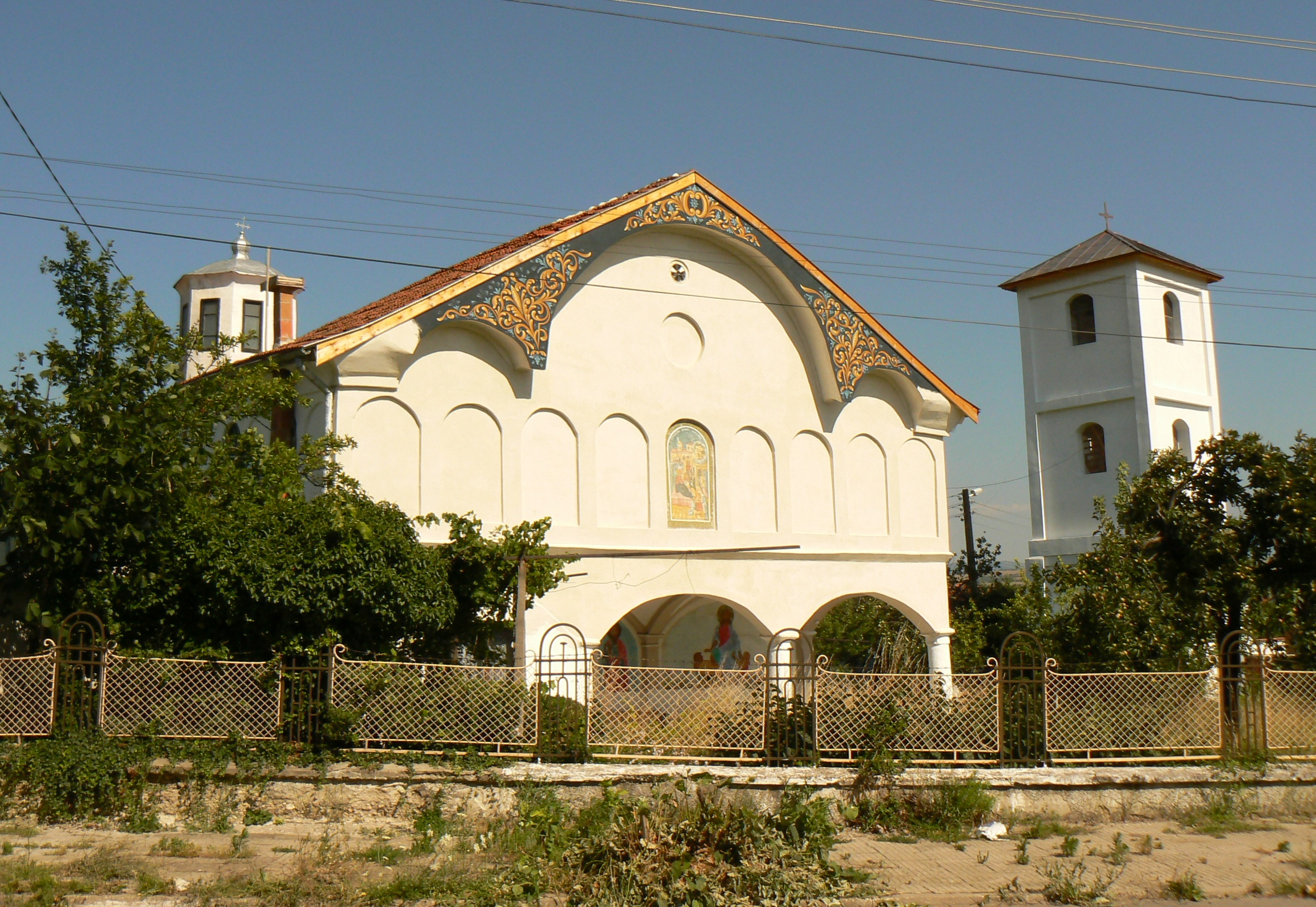
- Church of the Holy Mother of God

- Location within Bulgaria
- Coordinates: 42°5′N 23°4′E
- Country: Bulgaria
- Province: Kyustendil Province
- Municipality: Kocherinovo

Government
  - Mayor: Stanislav Gorov

Area
  - Total: 18.515 km^{2} (7.149 sq mi)
- Elevation: 392 m (1,286 ft)

Population (2013)
  - Total: 2,255
- Time zone: UTC+2 (EET)
  - Summer (DST): UTC+3 (EEST)
- Postal Code: 2640
- Area code: 07053

Kocherinovo (Bulgarian: Кочериново, pronounced [kot͡ʃɛˈrinovo]) is a town in southwestern Bulgaria, part of Kyustendil Province. It is the administrative centre of Kocherinovo Municipality, which lies in the southern part of Kyustendil Province. As of 2013 it had 2,255 inhabitants.

Kocherinovo is situated close to the left bank of the Struma River; its southernmost neighbourhood Levski lies at the confluence of the Struma and the Rilska River. The town is located 70 kilometres south of Sofia, 8 kilometres north of Blagoevgrad and 2 kilometres off European route E79 and Struma motorway, on the way to the Rila Monastery. In the 1930s, famous Bulgarian poet Nikola Vaptsarov worked in a Kocherinovo factory near the village of Barakovo as a stoker and a technician.

The town's name stems from the dialectal word kocherina, a derivative of kocher, "pigsty, section of a shed". It is related to the placename Kočerin near Široki Brijeg, Bosnia and Herzegovina and Kocherovo near Gotse Delchev. The name was first mentioned in 1878. In 1974, Kocherinovo was proclaimed a town.
