= Simitli Municipality =

Coordinates: 41.8931°N 23.1119°E

Simitli Municipality Община Симитли
- Municipality
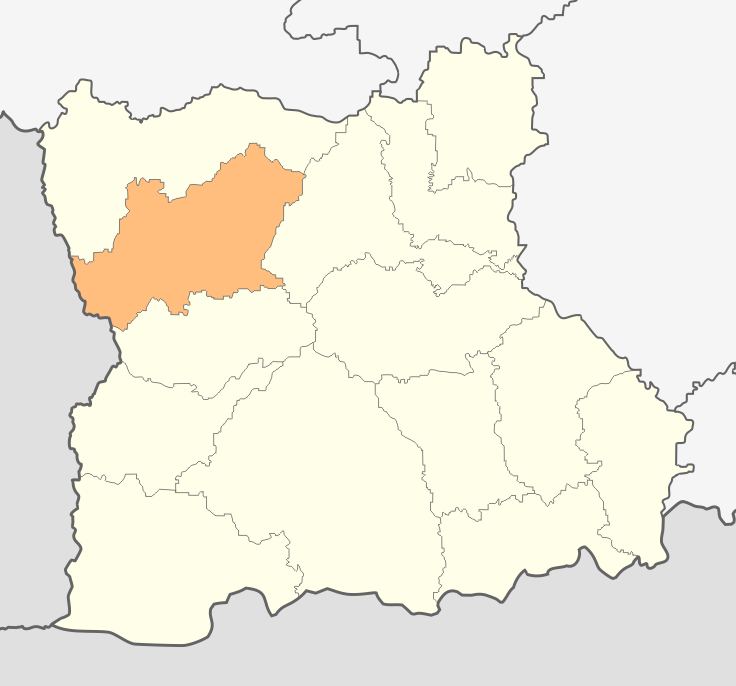
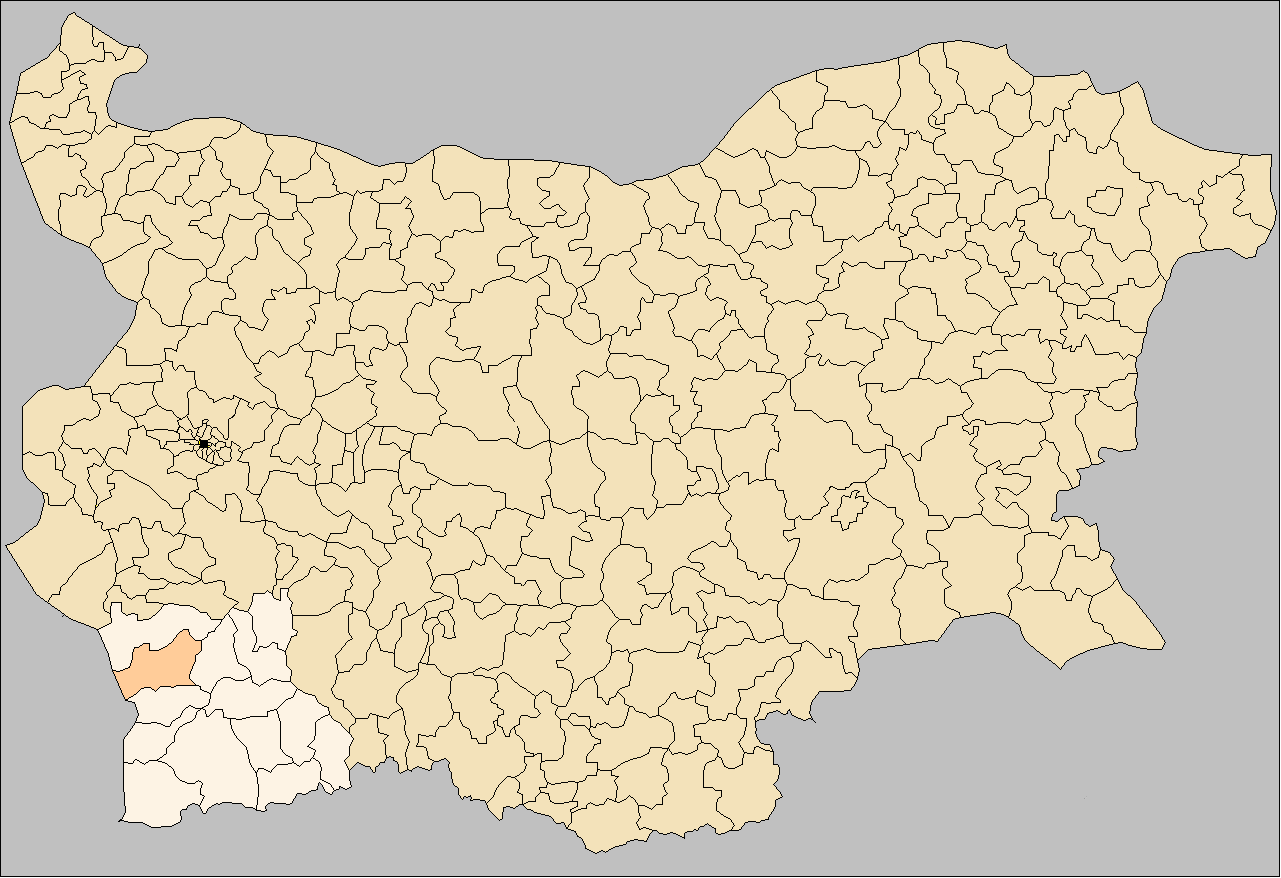
- Location in Blagoevgrad province Location on map of Bulgaria
- Country: Bulgaria
- Province (Oblast): Blagoevgrad

Area
  - Total: 553.004 km^{2} (213.516 sq mi)

Population
  - Total: 14,904
  - Density: 26.951/km^{2} (69.803/sq mi)

Simitli Municipality is a municipality in Blagoevgrad Province in Southwestern Bulgaria.

== Demographics ==
=== Religion ===
According to the latest Bulgarian census of 2011, the religious composition, among those who answered the optional question on religious identification, was the following:

Religious composition of Simitli Municipality
Orthodox Christianity	89.25%
Catholicism	0.31%
Protestantism	0.43%
Islam	7.34%
No religion	0.76%
Prefer not to answer, others and aindefinable	1.91%
