= Kocherinovo Municipality =

Kocherinovo Municipality Община Кочериново
- Municipality
- Location within Bulgaria
- Coordinates: 42°5′N 23°4′E
- Country: Bulgaria
- Province: Kyustendil
- Municipality: Kocherinovo

Area
  - Total: 182.31 km^{2} (70.39 sq mi)

Population (1-Feb-2011)
  - Total: 5,214
  - Density: 28.60/km^{2} (74.07/sq mi)
- Time zone: UTC+2 (EET)
  - Summer (DST): UTC+3 (EEST)
- Website: www.ob-kocherinovo.bg

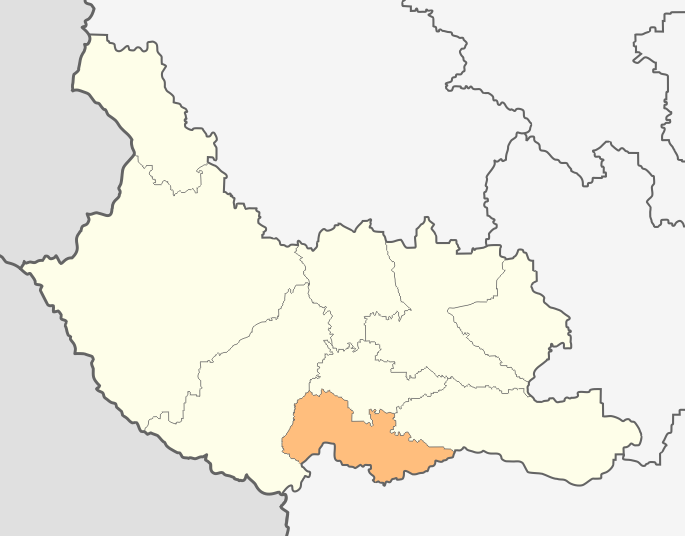
Kocherinovo municipality within Kyustendil Province

Kocherinovo Municipality is a municipality in Kyustendil Province, Bulgaria. The administrative centre is Kocherinovo.

== Religion ==
According to the latest Bulgarian census of 2011, the religious composition, among those who answered the optional question on religious identification, was the following:

Religious composition of Kocherinovo Municipality
Orthodox Christianity	67.4%
Catholicism	0.2%
Protestantism	0.1%
Islam	0.1%
No religion	0.5%
Prefer not to answer, others and indefinable	31.7%
