= Blagoevgrad Municipality =

Blagoevgrad Municipality Община Благоевград
- Municipality (Obshtina)
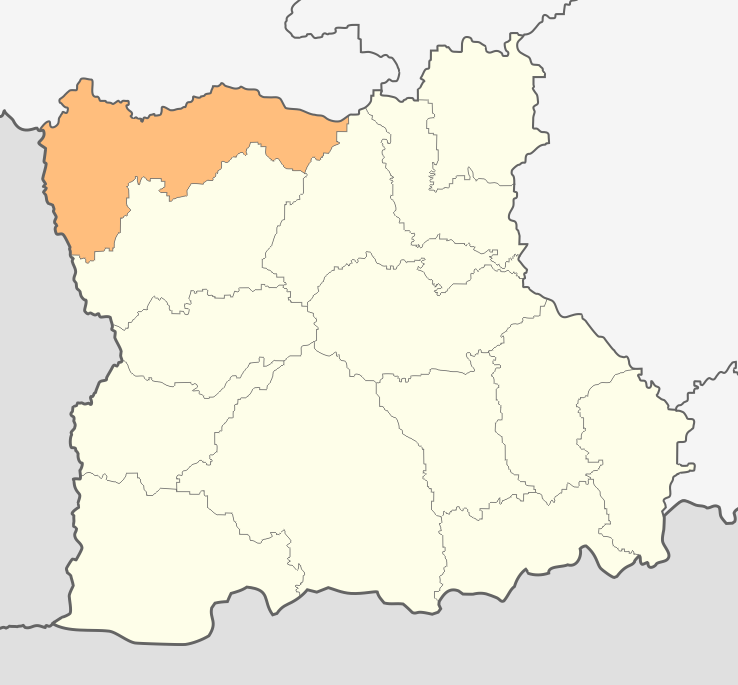
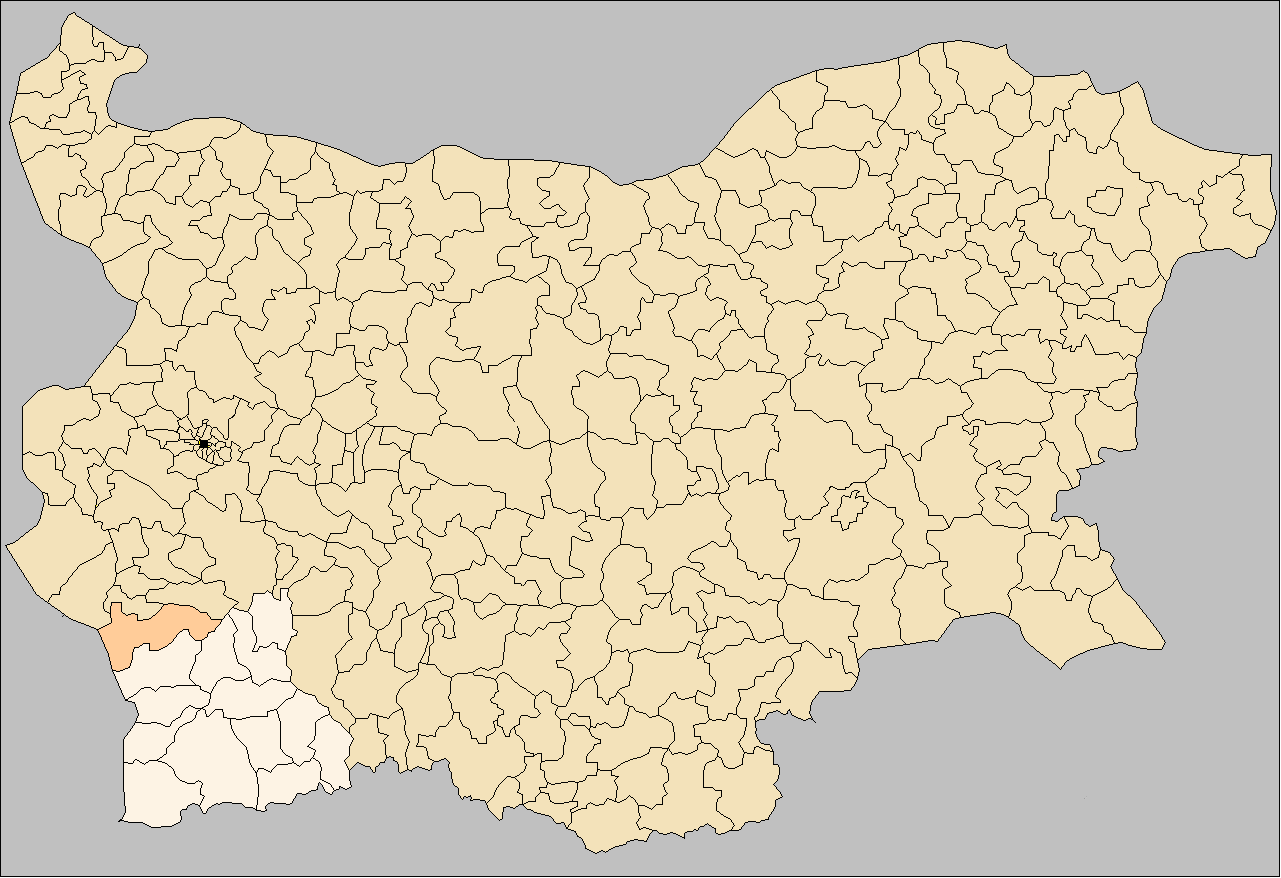
- Location in Blagoevgrad province Location on map of Bulgaria
- Coordinates: 42.0227°N 23.0975°E
- Country: Bulgaria
- Province (Oblast): Blagoevgrad
- Seat: Blagoevgrad

Government
  - Mayor: Metodi Baykushev (We Continue the Change)

Area
  - Total: 620.12 km^{2} (239.43 sq mi)
- Elevation: 560 m (1,840 ft)

Population (2011)
  - Total: 77,441
  - Density: 124.88/km^{2} (323.4/sq mi)
- Demonym: Blagoevgradchanin / pl. Blagoevgrachani
- Time zone: UTC+2 (EET)
  - Summer (DST): UTC+3 (EEST)
- Website: www.blgmun.com

Blagoevgrad Municipality (Bulgarian: Община Благоевград, Obshtina Blagoevgrad) is the most populated municipality in Blagoevgrad Province. It includes Blagoevgrad and 25 villages with population of 77,441 (2011).

== Geography ==
Blagoevgrad municipality is situated in the northwestern part of Blagoevgrad Province with area of 620.12 km^{2}.It borders with Kyustendil Province in the north, Razlog Municipality in the east, Simitli Municipality in the south and North Macedonia in the west. The municipality is lying in the western part of the Rila mountain and the northern part of the valley of Struma river, 100 km from Sofia in the north and Kulata in the south on the international road E79.

== Climate ==
The climate is transitional-continental with strong Mediterranean influence and the weather is mild in the winter and hot in the summer in the valley of Struma river and in the lower parts – 80% of the territory of the municipality. In the higher parts of the municipality the climate is mountainous – the other 20%.

== Nature ==
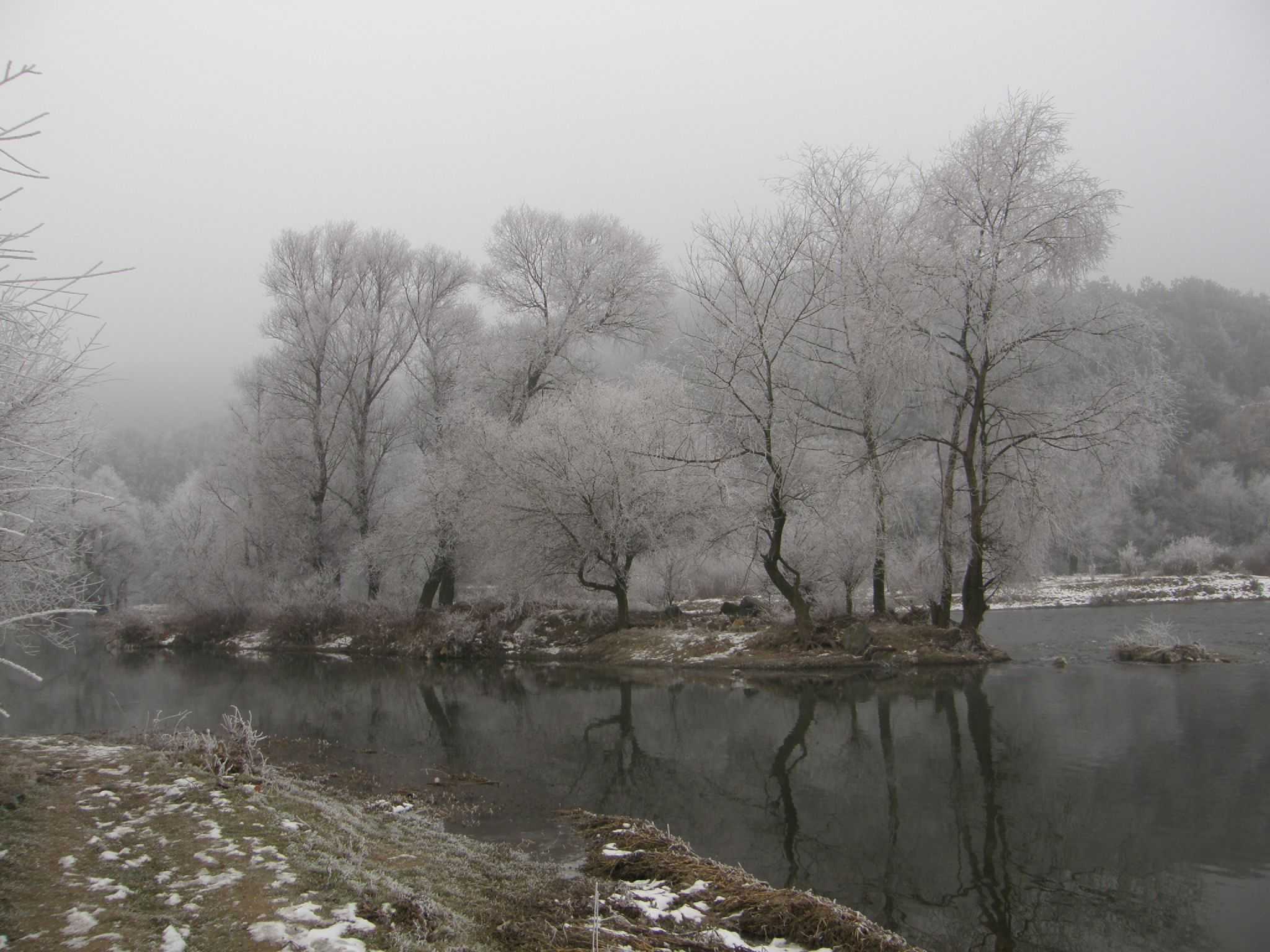

The most parts of the municipality are covered with forests. Small subsidiaries of Struma river form the water resources of the region. The snow-melting during the spring and the summer in Rila and Vlahina increases the river debit. The Bistrica river flows through Blagoevgrad and Struma river goes west of the town. There are thirty hot mineral springs in the municipality, even in Blagoevgrad.

== Population and settlements ==
The population of the municipality is 77,441, according to the last count in 2011 year. Men are 48%, women 52% of the population. The municipality is highly urbanized – 91% of all the people live in Blagoevgrad. The mountainous villages are very sparsely populated.

The following table shows the change of the population during the last four decades.

Blagoevgrad Municipality
Year	1975	1985	1992	2001	2005	2007	2009	2011
Population	58,812	72,498	78,810	78,175	77,346	76,257	76,812	77,441
Sources: Census 2001, Census 2011, „pop-stat.mashke.org“,

=== Ethnic composition ===
According to the 2011 census, among those who answered the optional question on ethnic identification, the ethnic composition of the municipality was the following:

Ethnic group	Population	Percentage
Bulgarians	68702	95.9%
Turks	126	0.2%
Roma (Gypsy)	1836	2.6%
Other	700	1%
Undeclared	282	0.4%

=== Religion ===
According to the latest Bulgarian census of 2011, the religious composition, among those who answered the optional question on religious identification, was the following:

.

Religious composition of Blagoevgrad Municipality
Orthodox Christianity	90.1%
Catholicism	0.4%
Protestantism	0.6%
Islam	0.6%
No religion	3.5%
Prefer not to answer, others and indefinable	4.8%

== Roads and transportation ==
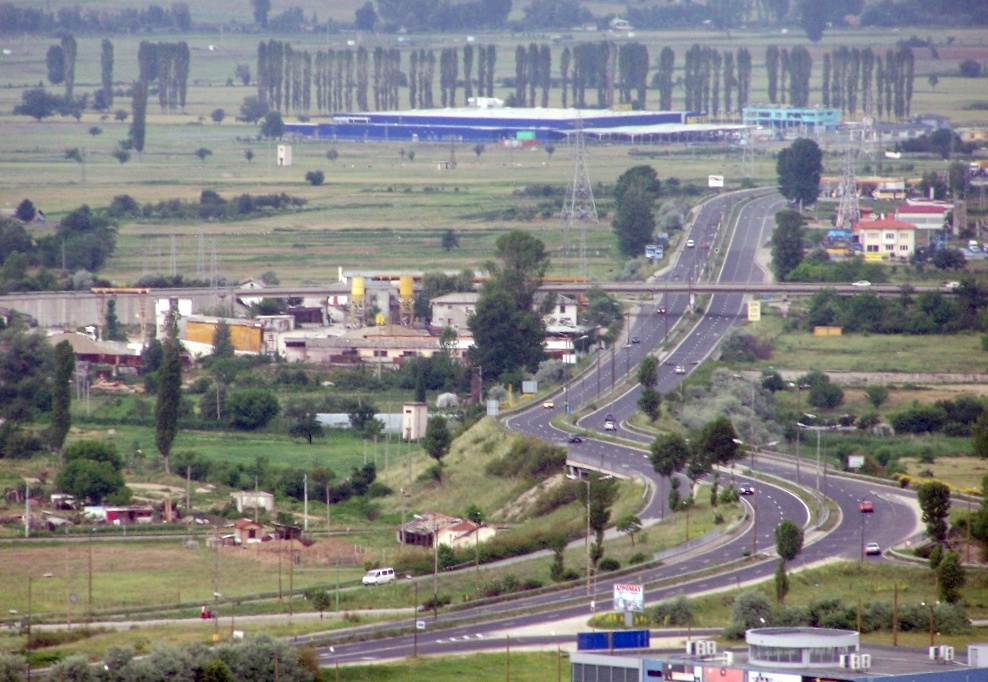
E79 in Blagoevgrad and the road to Logodazh behind it

The municipality has a very favorable location. E79 international road passes through Belo Pole and the western parts of Blagoevgrad alongside the Struma river and connects the region with Sofia on the north and Greece in the south. There is a parallel railway, which leads to Greece, but now due to the policy of the Greek rail operator there are no trains between Sofia and Athens. There is also a road connection with North Macedonia via Logodazh. The fourth class municipal roads need improvement. Blagoevgrad has two bus stations and a train station situated in the western part of the town. Buses connect Blagoevgrad with Sofia, Plovdiv, Sandanski, Petrich, Goce Delchev, Kyustendil, Dupnitsa and other destinations in the region as well as most of the villages in the municipality. There are international bus lines to Greece and North Macedonia. Trains connect the municipality with Sofia, Pernik, Dupnitsa and Sandanski and other smaller settlements alongside Struma river. There is a train stop in Belo Pole, train station in Blagoevgrad and another train stop in the southern part of Blagoevgrad.

== Economy ==
There are few big industrial subjects in the municipality and they are concentrated in Blagoevgrad. Trade and services form significant part of the municipal economy. The presence of two universities and a lot of young people is boosting them and also providing qualified labor force. Agriculture and forestry are important parts of the regional economy too.

== Tourism ==
There are more than 10 hotels in Blagoevgrad. Visitors can see a neighborhood with old houses "Varosha". The hot mineral water in Blagoevgrad is not widely utilized, but there is communal bath. The mountains in the region offers a lot of places for hiking and picnics. All the cultural institutions are in Blagoevgrad – the theater, museums, art galleries and cultural centers.
