= Blagoevgrad Province =

Province in southwestern Bulgaria

Coordinates: 41°45′N 23°15′E

Blagoevgrad Province Област Благоевград
- Province
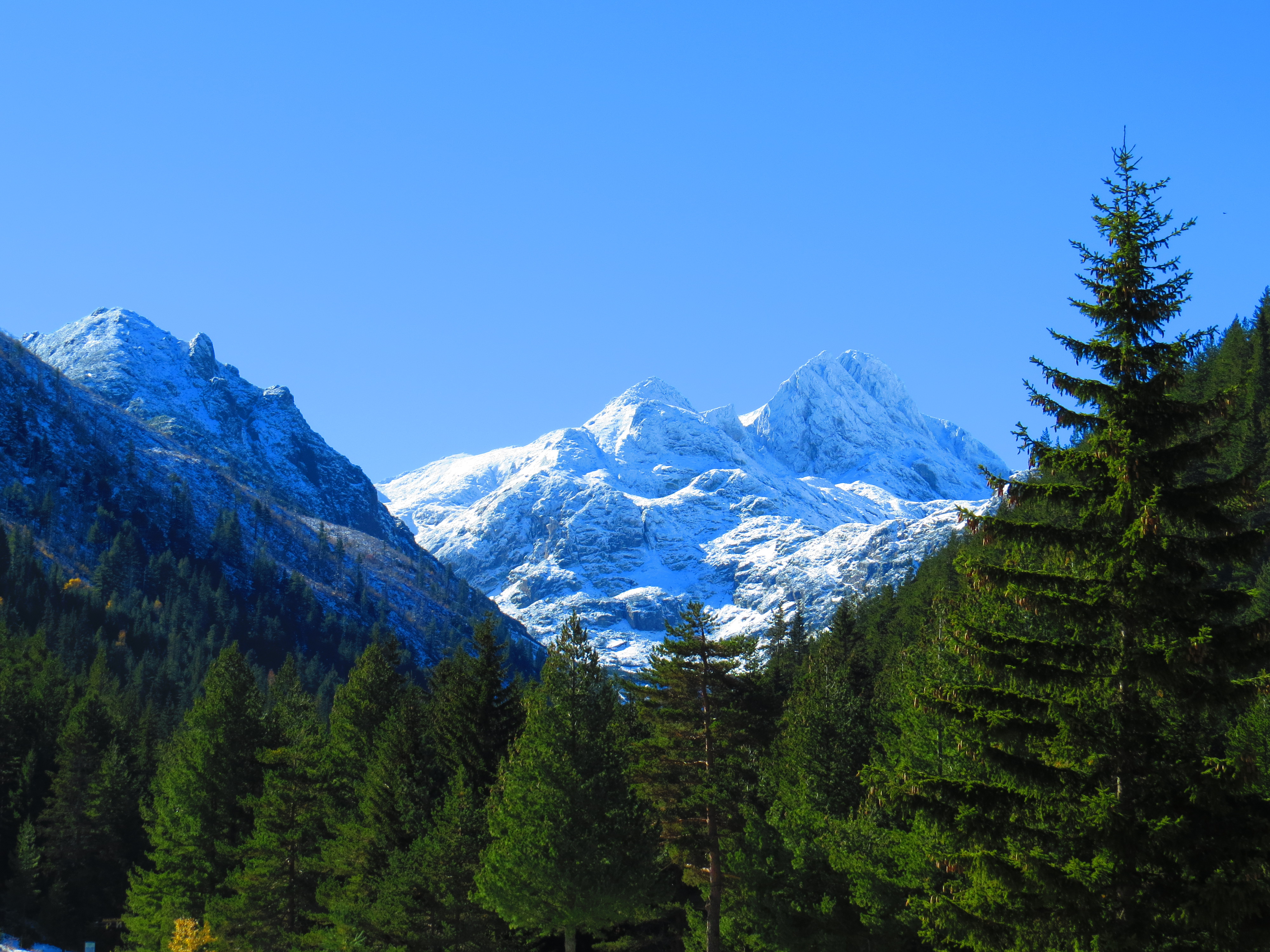
- Malyovitsa

- Location of Blagoevgrad Province in Bulgaria
- Country: Bulgaria
- Capital: Blagoevgrad
- Municipalities: 14

Government
  - Governor: Nikolay Kukolev

Area
  - Total: 6,449.47 km^{2} (2,490.15 sq mi)
- Elevation: 555 m (1,821 ft)

Population (December 2022)
  - Total: 288,161
  - Density: 44.6798/km^{2} (115.720/sq mi)
- Time zone: UTC+2 (EET)
  - Summer (DST): UTC+3 (EEST)
- Postal codes: 2700 to 2969
- ISO 3166 code: BG-01
- License plate: E
- Website: www.bl.government.bg

Blagoevgrad Province (Bulgarian: област Благоевград, oblast Blagoevgrad or Благоевградска област, Blagoevgradska oblast), also known as Pirin Macedonia or Bulgarian Macedonia (Bulgarian: Пиринска Македония; Българска Македония), (Pirinska Makedoniya or Bulgarska Makedoniya) is a province (oblast) of southwestern Bulgaria. It borders four other Bulgarian provinces to the north and east, the Greek region of Macedonia to the south, and North Macedonia to the west. The province has 14 municipalities with 12 towns. Its principal city is Blagoevgrad, while other significant towns include Bansko, Gotse Delchev, Melnik, Petrich, Razlog, Sandanski, and Simitli.

== Geography ==
The province has a territory of 6,449.5 km^{2} (2,490.2 sq mi) and a population of 323,552 (as of 2011). It is the third largest in Bulgaria after Burgas and Sofia Provinces and comprises 5.8% of the country's territory. Blagoevgrad Province includes the mountains, or parts of, Rila (highest point of the Balkans — Musala summit, 2925 m), Pirin (highest point — Vihren summit, 2914 m), the Rhodopes, Slavyanka, Belasitsa, Vlahina, Maleshevo, Ograzhden, and Stargach.There are two major rivers — Struma River and Mesta River — with population concentrations along their valleys, which are also the main transport corridors.

=== Climate ===
The climate varies from temperate continental to Mediterranean in the southernmost parts. Natural resources are timber, mineral springs, coal, construction materials, including marble and granite. The beautiful and preserved environment is widely considered an important resource. A number of national parks and protected territories care for the biodiversity. Arable land is 38.8% and forests constitute 52% of the province's territory.

== History ==
The Balkan Wars of 1912–1913 saw the annexation of the area to the Bulgarian state. Before the wars, it had been under Ottoman rule for over five centuries.

== Municipalities ==
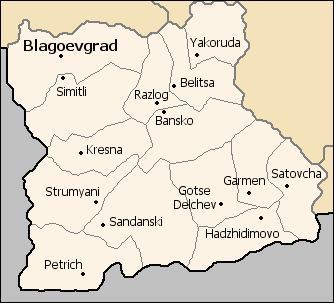
Map of Blagoevgrad Province showing the municipal subdivisions and centres

The Blagoevgrad province (област, oblast) contains 14 municipalities (singular: община, obshtina - plural: общини, obshtini). The following table shows the names of each municipality in English and Cyrillic, the main town (in bold) or village, and the population of each as of 2011.

Municipality	Cyrillic	Pop. census 2011	Town/Village	Pop. census 2011
Bansko	Банско	13,125	**Bansko**	8,562
Belitsa	Белица	9,927	**Belitsa**	3,362
Blagoevgrad	Благоевград	77,441	**Blagoevgrad**	70,881
Garmen	Гърмен	14,981	Garmen	1,982
Gotse Delchev	Гоце Делчев	31,236	**Gotse Delchev**	19,219
Hadzhidimovo	Хаджидимово	10,091	**Hadzhidimovo**	2,730
Kresna	Кресна	5,441	**Kresna**	3,470
Petrich	Петрич	54,006	**Petrich**	28,902
Razlog	Разлог	20,598	**Razlog**	11,960
Sandanski	Сандански	40,470	**Sandanski**	26,472
Satovcha	Сатовча	15,444	Satovcha	2,434
Simitli	Симитли	14,283	**Simitli**	6,674
Strumyani	Струмяни	5,778	Strumyani	998
Yakoruda	Якоруда	10,731	**Yakoruda**	5,792

== Economy ==
The region is characterized with diversified economic branch structure: food and tobacco processing industries, agriculture, tourism, transport and communications, textile industry, timber and furniture industries, iron processing and machinery industry, construction materials industry, as well as pharmaceuticals, plastics, paper and shoes production. Approximately 10% of the population is unemployed (close to the national average). There are 4 major hospitals in the province.

With its railway line and road connection, the region forms the heart of the land-based trading route between northern Greece, Bulgaria and Romania. Since the early 2000s the province enjoys a mini boom in trade from thousands of Greek day-trippers from across the border, purchasing cheaper goods and services (dental, opticians, etc.). Since the early 1990s, the region has also attracted Greek manufacturers who moved their production line from Greece, especially to Petrich. It was an important tourist destination during the communist years for East Germans and is slowly picking up again. The unique town of Melnik was once a wealthy centre built on the back of exiled phanariots from Constantinople. Now it is a centre for wine production and offers eco-tourism.

Infrastructure remains relatively underdeveloped, especially regarding road and rail communications. It remains an important target for potential EU funding. There are two major infrastructural projects in the region. The Struma motorway, which is planned to connect the capital Sofia with the Greek border and the port of Thessaloniki, is going to run through the valley of the Sruma River, and will be ready in a few years. The second project is the airport of Bansko. The cost is currently estimated at around €30,000,000.

== Culture, education and monuments ==
Historical and archaeological monuments include the ruins of antique Thracian and Roman settlements, Early Christian basilicas, medieval Byzantine and Bulgarian towns, monasteries and fortresses, as well as many preserved buildings and whole villages — examples of the architecture from the Ottoman period (like Melnik, the Rozhen Monastery and Bansko).

A theatre, a library with 345,000 tomes, and an opera house are situated in the provincial centre, Blagoevgrad. There are art galleries in Bansko, Blagoevgrad and Sandanski. Many small cultural institutions, chitalishta, are dispersed around the province. The Pirin State Ensemble is the most prominent among the numerous folklore and music bands. There are 10 museums in the province that preserve the rich historical, ethnographic and archaeological heritage. Cultural events include the Theatre Festival in Blagoevgrad, the Jazz Festival in Bansko and the Melnik Evenings of Poetry.

The Southwestern University and the American University in Bulgaria are situated in Blagoevgrad; the latter is the second largest American university campus in Europe and is located in the former headquarters of the communist party. Annually the city draws around 10,000 students from the country and abroad. The number of schools in the province is 182.

=== Notable people from Blagoevgrad Province ===
A number of the province's towns were renamed in honor of major figures such as Sandanski (after Yane Sandanski).

- Paisiy Hilendarski (1722–1773)
- Neofit Rilski (1793–1881)
- Georgi Izmirliev (1851–1876)
- Boris Sarafov (1872–1907)
- Yane Sandanski (1872–1915)
- Nikola Vaptsarov (1909–1942)
- Georgi Pirinski (1948)
- Rosen Plevneliev (1964)

== Demographics ==
Historical population
Year	Pop.	±%
1946	252,908	—
1956	281,015	+11.1%
1965	302,503	+7.6%
1975	322,974	+6.8%
1985	345,942	+7.1%
1992	351,637	+1.6%
2001	341,173	−3.0%
2011	323,552	−5.2%
2021	292,227	−9.7%
Source: pop-stat.mashke.org

The province had a population of 323,552 according to the 2011 census, of which 49.3% were male and 50.9% were female.

=== Ethnic groups ===
Ethnic groups in Blagoevgrad Province (2011 census)
Ethnic group	Percentage
Bulgarians	88.6%
Turks	6.0%
Romani	3.4%
others and indefinable	2.0%

Total population (2011 census): 323 552
Ethnic groups (2011 census): Identified themselves: 283,556 persons:

- Bulgarians: 251,097 (88,55%)
- Turks: 17,027 (6,0%)
- Romani: 9,739 (3,43%)
- Others and indefinable: 5,693 (2,01%)
- Unspecified: 40,524 (this figure is not included in the percentage.)

The ethnic Bulgarian population in the province also has a regional Macedonian identity, distinct from the ethnic Macedonian identity of Macedonians in the Republic of North Macedonia. According to the 2011 Bulgarian census, there were 561 ethnic Macedonians (0.2%) in the Blagoevgrad Province, out of a total of 1,654 Macedonians in the entire country. During the same year, a total of 429 citizens of the Republic of North Macedonia resided in the province. Since registering a permanent residence in Bulgaria is a requirement for becoming naturalized in Bulgaria, a total of 18,000 Macedonian nationals were registered as residents in the Blagoevgrad Municipality alone by 2017. They are citizens of the Republic of North Macedonia, but have also Bulgarian citizenship, based on declared Bulgarian ethnic origin; their number in the whole of the province is higher. However, the vast majority of these people do not permanently reside in the Blagoevgrad Province.

=== Languages ===
Mother tongues in the province according to 2001 census: 306,118 Bulgarian (89.7%), 19,819 Turkish (5.8%), 9,232 Romani (2.7%) and 6004 others and unspecified (1.6%).

=== Religion ===
Religions in Blagoevgrad Province (2011 census)
Religious group	Percentage
Orthodox Christian	60.86%
Muslim	12.56%
Protestant Christian	0.46%
Roman Catholic Christian	0.22%
others and indefinable	25.86%

Religious adherence in the province according to 2001 census:

Census 2001
religious adherence	population	%
Orthodox Christians	268,968	78.84%
Muslims	62,431	18.30%
Protestants	1,546	0.45%
Roman Catholics	277	0.08%
Other	933	0.27%
Religion not mentioned	7,018	2.06%
total	341,173	100%

Most Muslims in the province are Bulgarian Muslims, also called Pomaks. That makes Blagoevgrad Province together with Smolyan Province and the area around Velingrad one of the few places where Bulgarian Muslims make up the majority of the Muslims while in Bulgaria general most Muslims are from Turkish background.

== Sport ==
Blagoevgrad Province is currently one of the best-represented provinces in Bulgarian football, with 3 teams playing in the Bulgarian A PFG (second only to Sofia with 4) — FC Vihren Sandanski, PFC Belasitsa Petrich and PFC Pirin 1922 Blagoevgrad. One more team from the province, PFC Pirin Blagoevgrad (as distinct from Pirin 1922), began the 2005/06 season in the highest Bulgarian division, but disbanded shortly afterwards due to financial problems.

Owing to the alpine features and accessible location, the northern and eastern regionof Blagoevgrad Province is also a centre of winter sports. The main centre is Bansko which is becoming a leading skiing resort at European level with rapidly rising property prices.

== Gallery ==
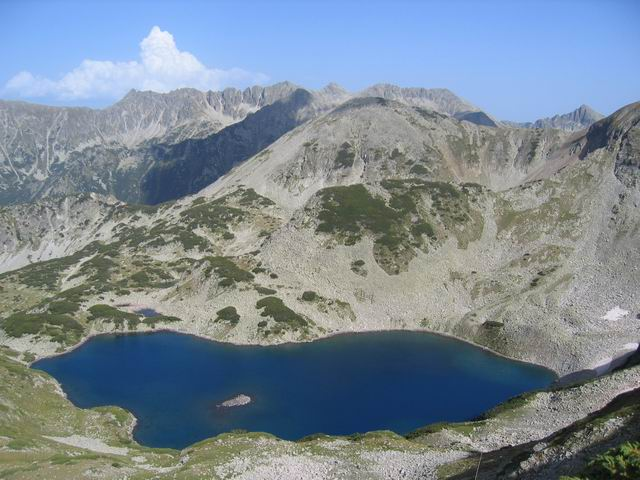
Tevno Vasilashko Lake in Pirin

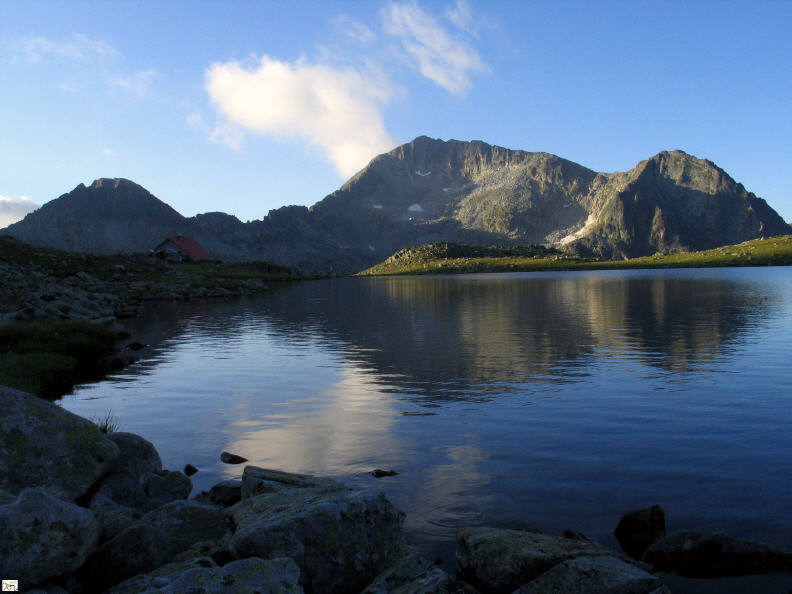
Kamenitsa Peak and lake Tevno ezero in Pirin

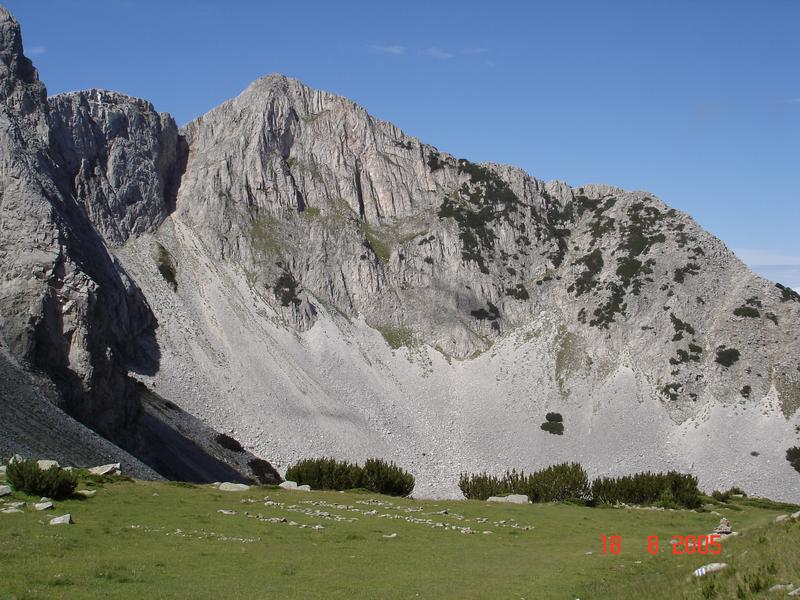
Sinanitsa Peak in Pirin

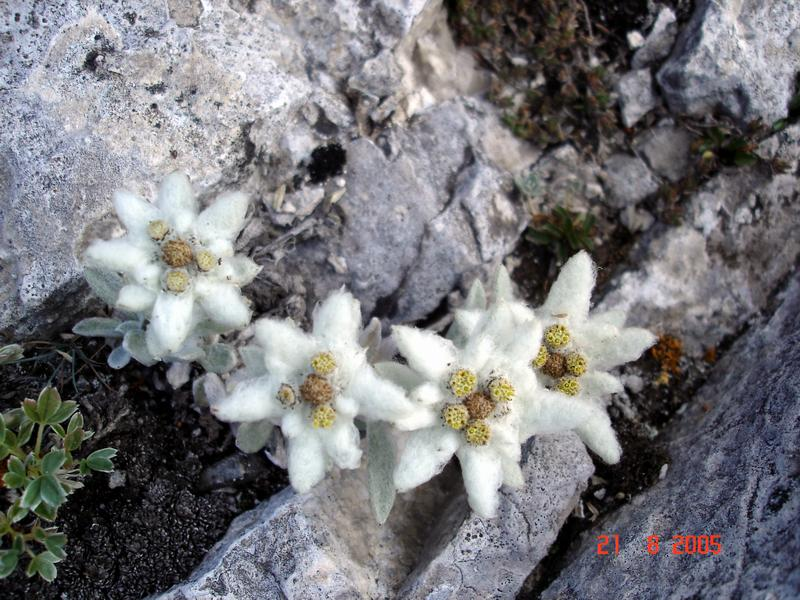
Edelweisses under the Koncheto ridge in Pirin

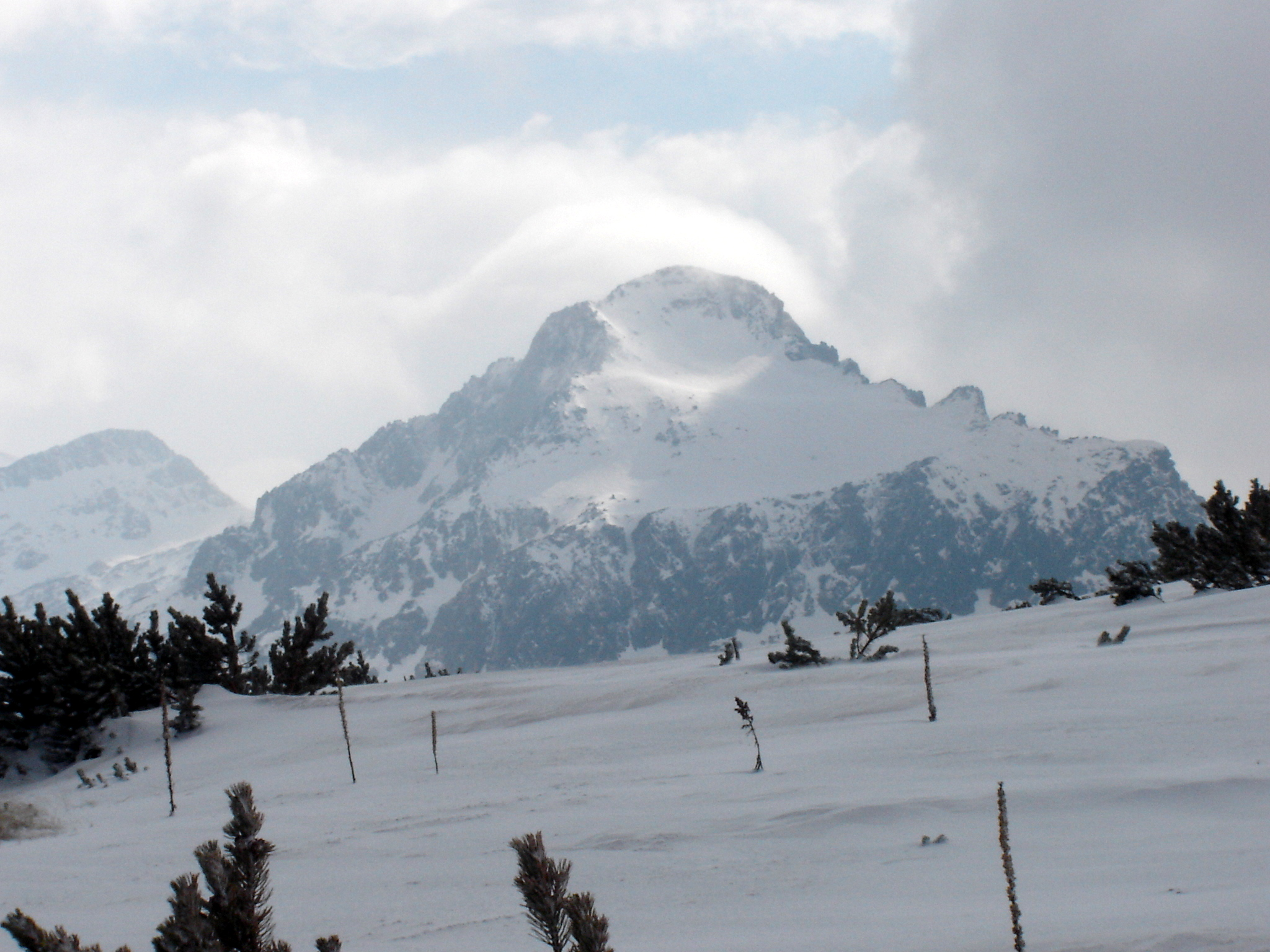
Dzhengal Peak in Pirin up-close in late April

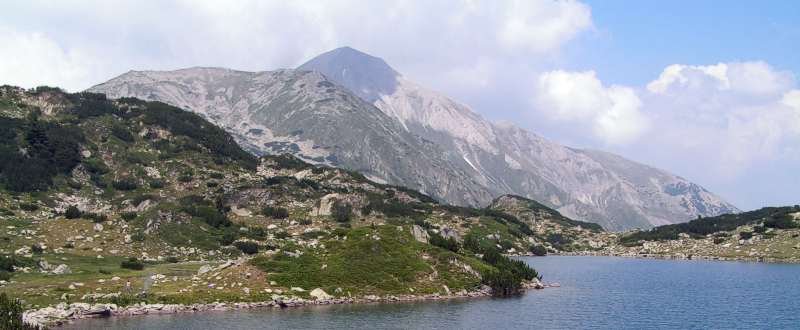
Vihren Peak in Pirin mountain

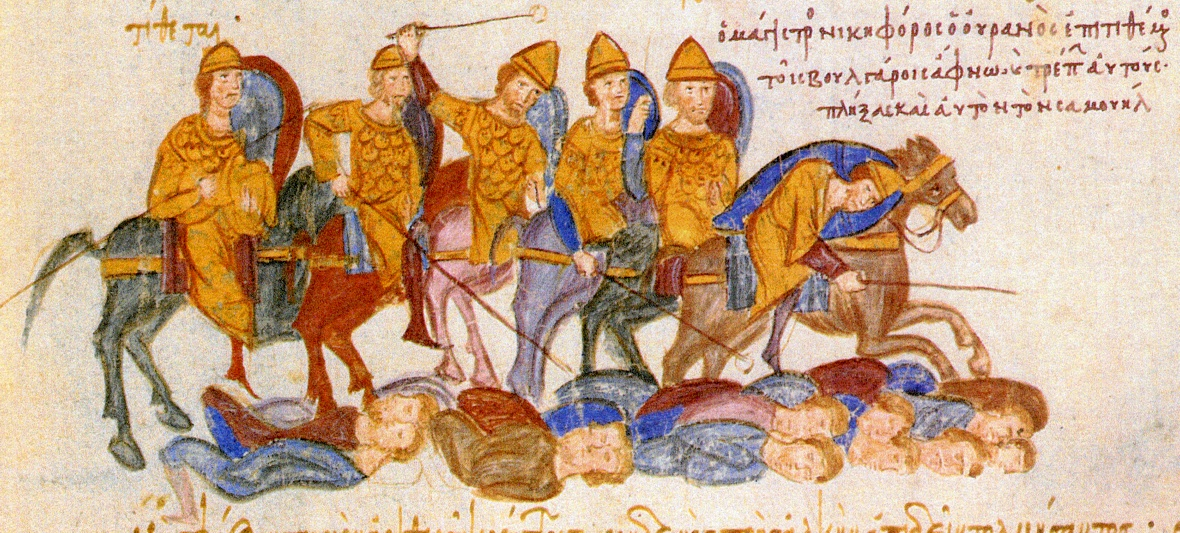
The defeat of the army of Tsar Samuil of Bulgaria in the medieval Battle of Kleidion

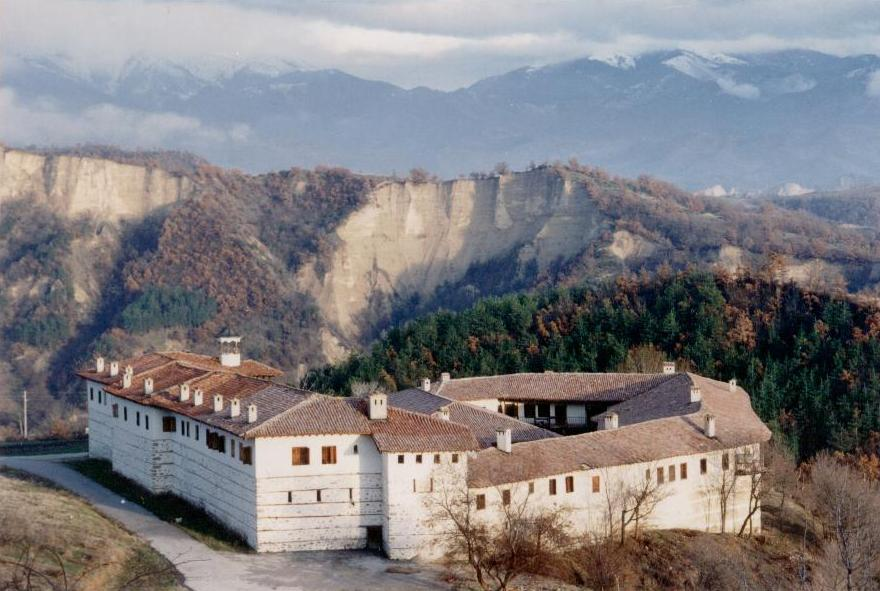
The Rozhen Monastery from the outside

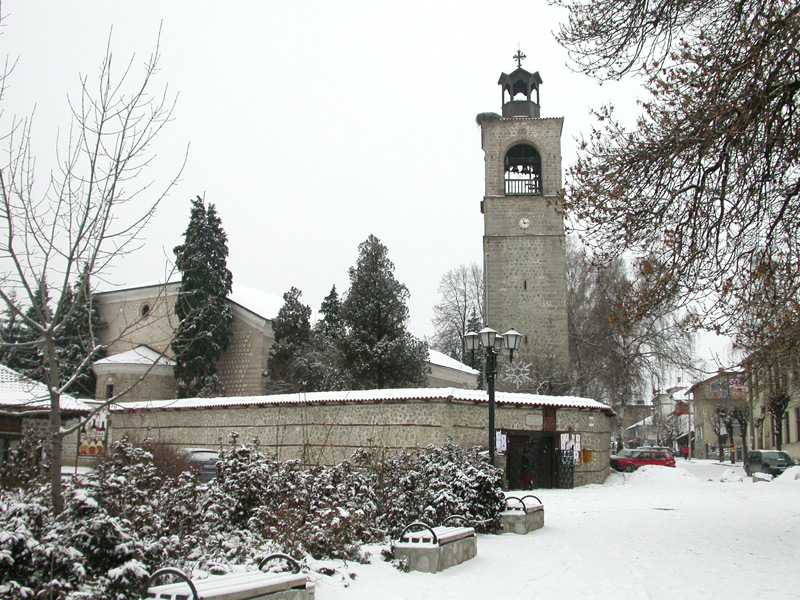
The Church of the Holy Trinity in Bansko

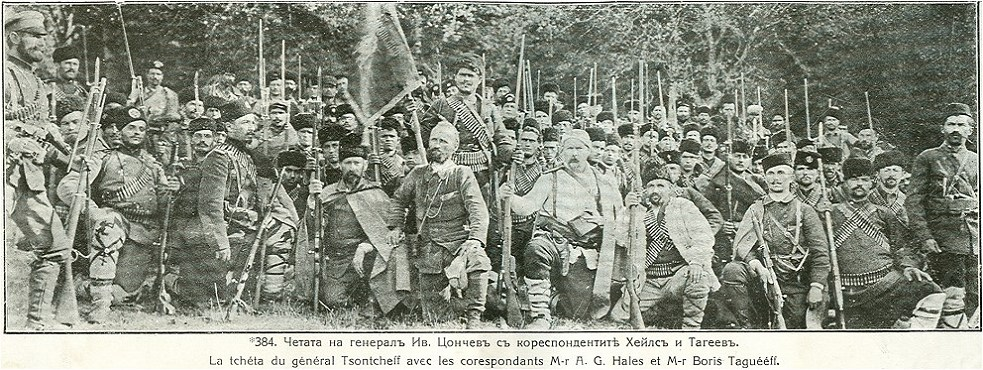
Genеral Ivan Tsonchev's revolutionary band

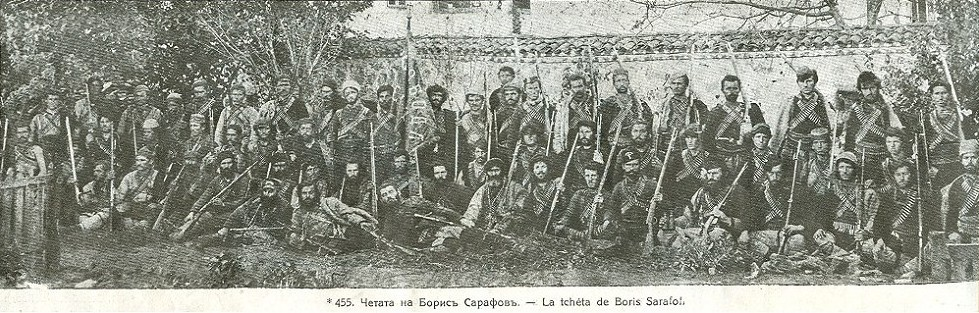
Lieutenant Boris Sarafov's revolutionary band

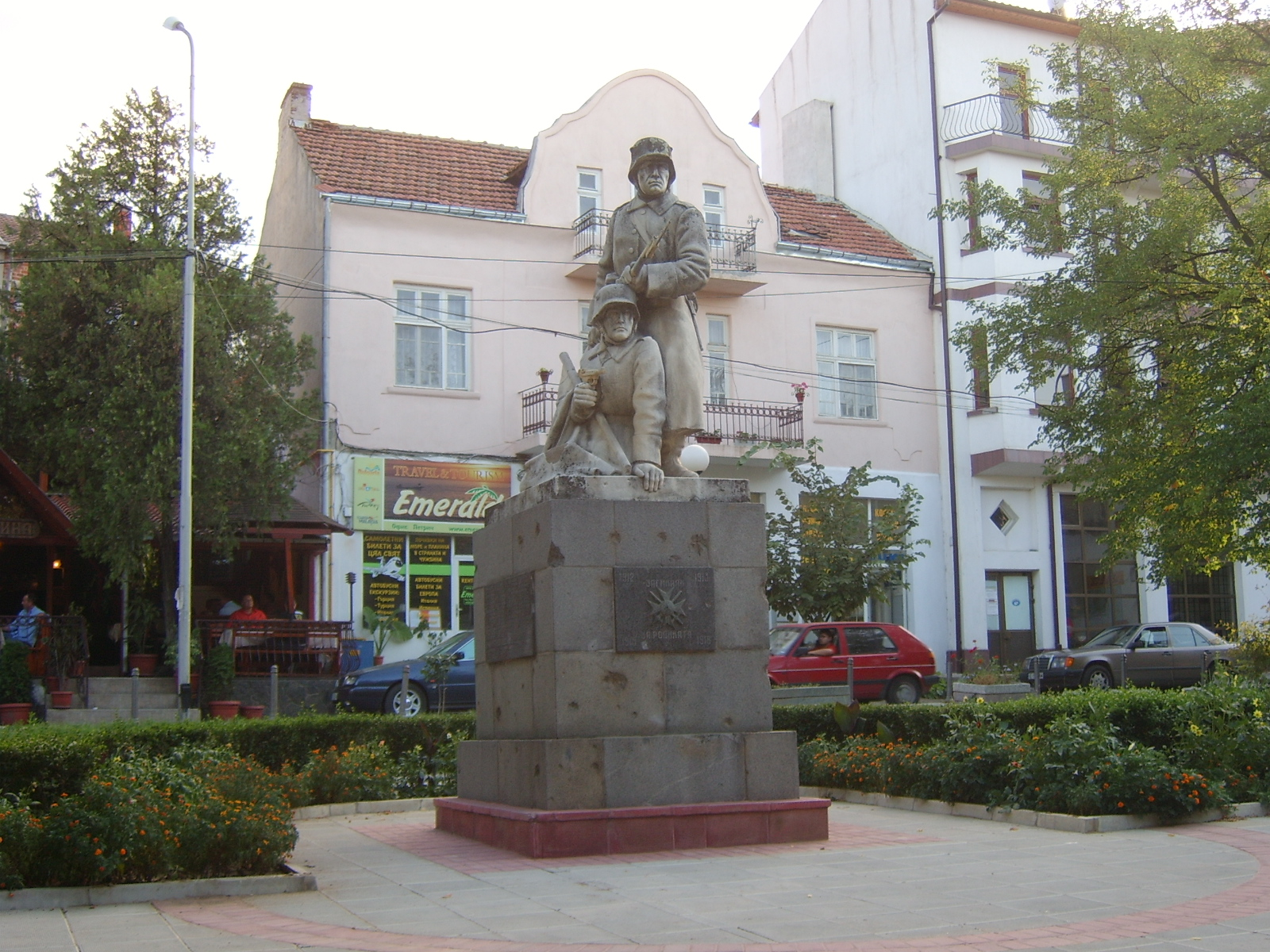
Monument to the perished Bulgarian soldiers during World War I in Petrich

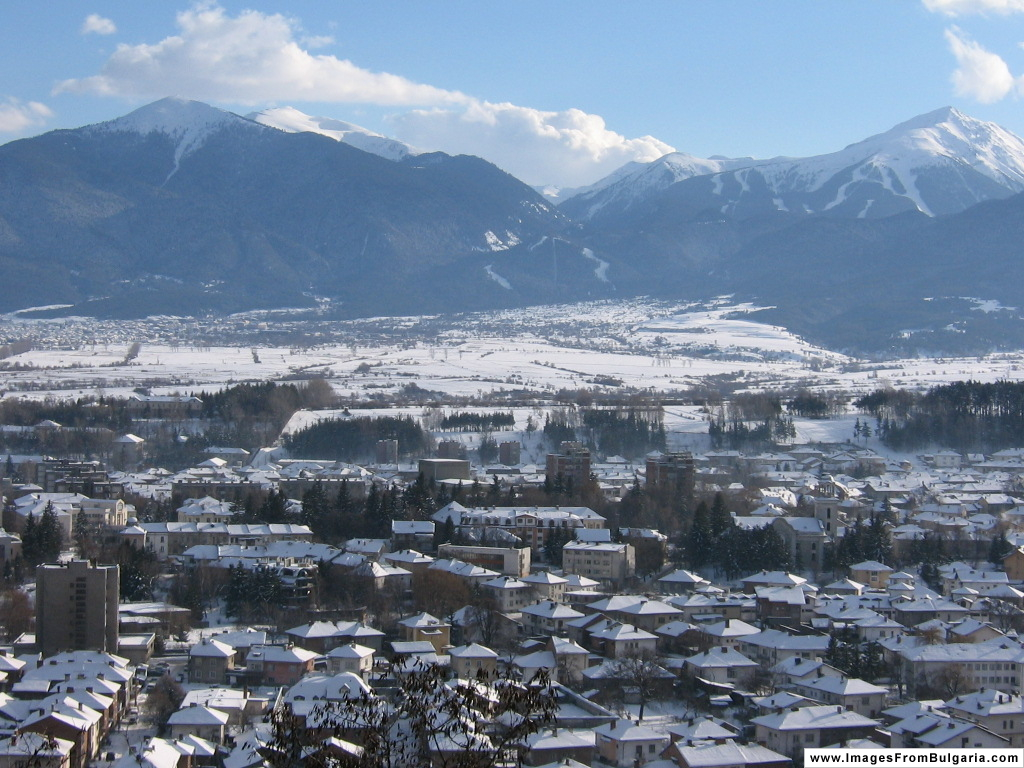
Bansko Ski Zone as seen from Razlog

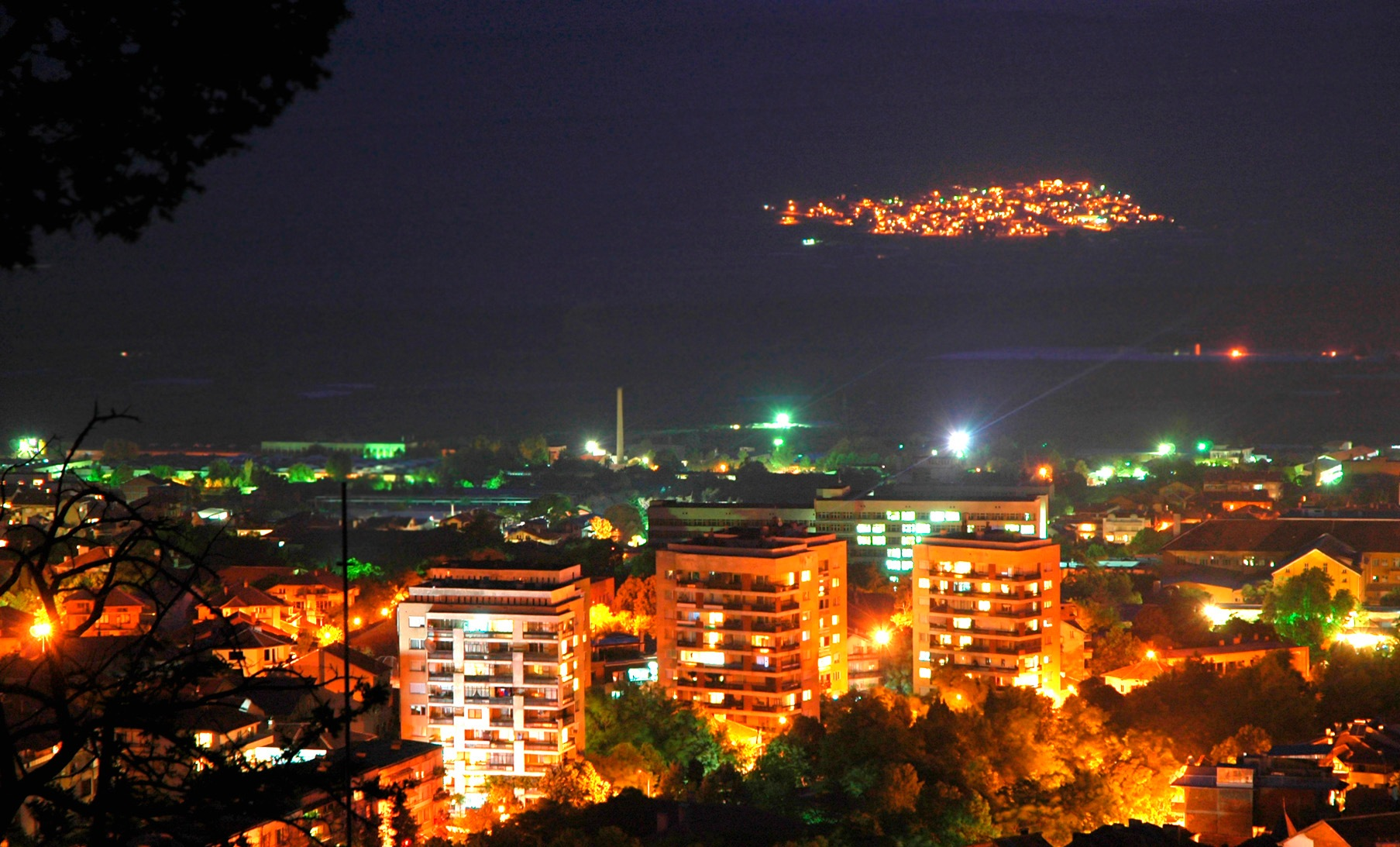
Petrich at night

== See also ==
- Provinces of Bulgaria
- Municipalities of Bulgaria
- List of cities and towns in Bulgaria
- List of villages in Blagoevgrad Province

== Sources ==
- Who are the Macedonians? by Hugh Poulton. London: 1995.
