= List of tunnels in Bulgaria =

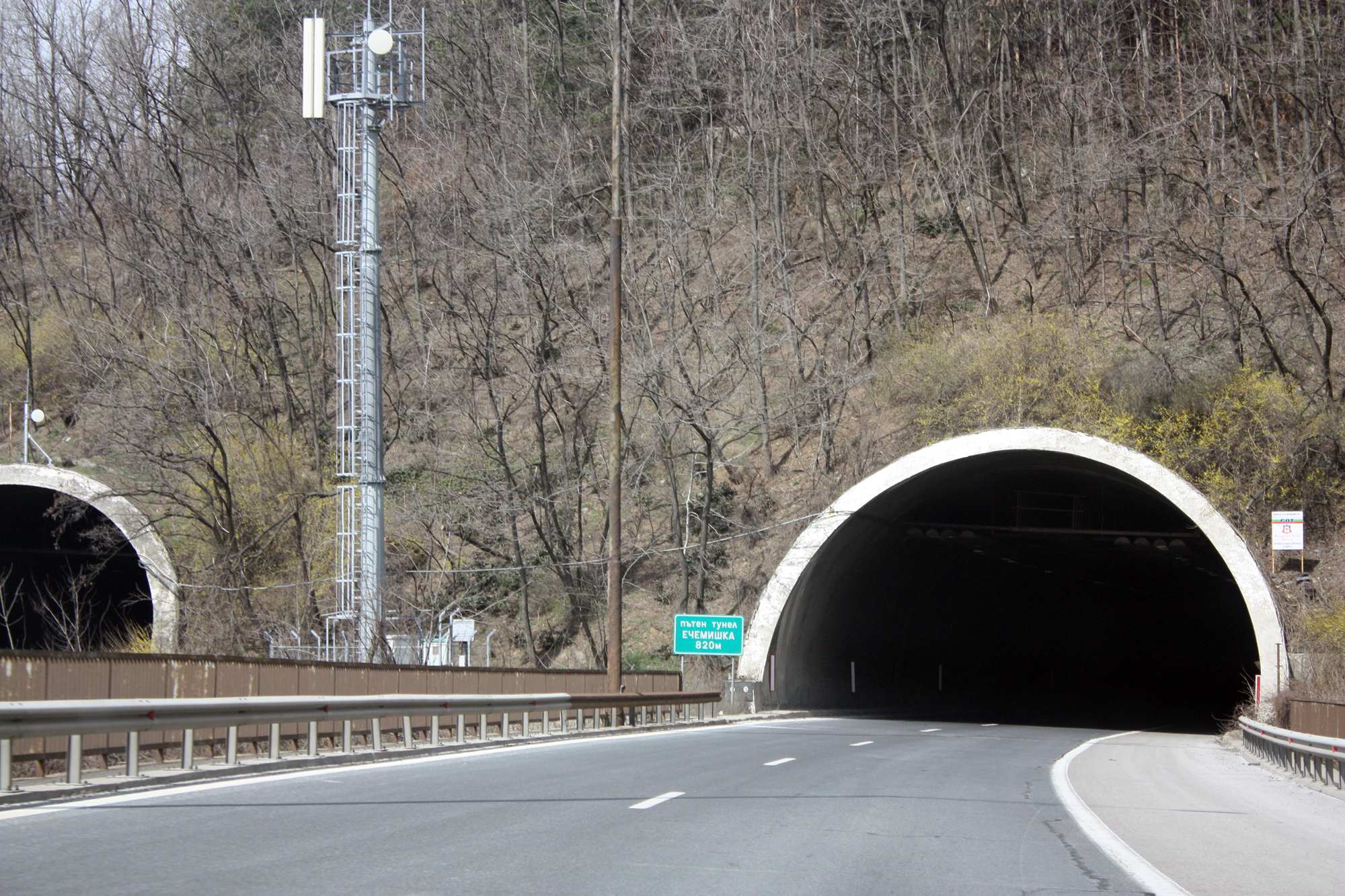
The twin tubes of the Echemishka tunnel.

This article lists tunnels in Bulgaria by type. The longest railway tunnel is Koznitsa, at 5.8 kilometres (3.6 mi), and the longest road tunnel is Zheleznitsa, at 2 kilometres (1.2 mi).

== Railway tunnels ==
The following is a list of the railway tunnels in Bulgaria longer than 0.5 kilometres (0.31 mi). It does not include planned, abandoned, or unfinished tunnels. The tunnels of the Sofia Metro are not included either.

Tunnel	Length (m)	Date of opening	Coordinates
Tunnel #1 on the line from Sofia to Mezdra, north of Kurilo	506	1962	42.85631°N 23.36974°E
Galabets tunnel, on the Sofia-Karlovo line	3,030	1951	42.720556°N 23.896944°E
Koznitsa tunnel, on the Sofia-Karlovo line	5,810	1951	42.698333°N 24.381944°E
Tunnel #9 on the Sofia–Karlovo line, above Klisura	1,850	1950	42.70377°N 24.45637°E
Tunnel #10 on the Sofia–Karlovo line, near Klisura	575	1950	42.69580°N 24.44664°E
Tunnel #13 on the Sofia–Karlovo line, near Klisura	568	1948	42.68730°N 24.44979°E
Tunnel #10 on the Ruse–Stara Zagora line, near Radevtsi	540	1913	42.80481°N 25.50775°E
Tunnel #11 on the Ruse–Stara Zagora line, near Radevtsi	764	1913	42.78909°N 25.52183°E
Tunnel #12 on the Ruse–Stara Zagora line, near Bazovets	607	1913	42.78794°N 25.54317°E
Tunnel #19 on the Ruse–Stara Zagora line, near Krastets	670	1913	42.77396°N 25.55405°E
Tunnel #23 on the Ruse–Stara Zagora line, near Raduntsi	1,100	1911	42.68251°N 25.60427°E
Tunnel #24 on the Ruse–Stara Zagora line, near Raduntsi	808	1911	42.67809°N 25.59003°E
Tunnel #25 on the Ruse–Stara Zagora line, near Raduntsi	670	1911	42.67511°N 25.58688°E
Tunnel #1 on the Haskovo–Kardzhali line, near Most	1,120	1930	41.73218°N 25.53153°E
Tunnel #14 on the Sofia-Kulata line, in the Kresna Gorge	529	1943	41.79415°N 23.16187°E
Tunnel #21 on the Sofia-Kulata line, near Damyanitsa	560	1943	41.46505°N 23.27097°E
Tunnel #3 on the Voluyak–Pernik line, near Raduy	1,390	1950	42.72098°N 23.02605°E

== Road tunnels ==
The following is a list of the road tunnels with a length of 0.5 kilometres (0.31 mi) or over. It does not include tunnels under construction.

Tunnel	Length (m)	Date of opening	Coordinates
Zheleznitsa (on Struma motorway near Simitli)	2,000	2024	41.943639°N 23.106815°E
Vitinya (on Hemus motorway below Vitinya Pass)	1,195	1984	42.781139°N 23.797556°E
Topli Dol (on Hemus motorway near Botevgrad)	883	1980s	42.83773°N 23.79667°E
Echemishka (on Hemus motorway near Botevgrad)	775	1980s	42.85631°N 23.79079°E
Praveshki Hanove (on Hemus motorway near Pravets)	871	1999	42.91528°N 23.91496°E
Trayanovi Vrata (on Trakia motorway, below the Gate of Trajan pass )	740	1970s	42.35428°N 23.91841°E
A tunnel on the Gabrovo Ring-road	540	2020	42.85980°N 25.28691°E
Golemo Buchino (Lyulin motorway)	500	2011	42.62729°N 23.12801°E
Lyaskovo (on the bypass of Tsankov Kamak)	882	2010	41.79460°N 24.47626°E

The Kresna Gorge Tunnel, if built, would have been Bulgaria's longest tunnel at over 15 kilometres (9.3 mi). It was cancelled in 2015, before construction had begun, and it will be replaced with an alternative route featuring a number of smaller tunnels.

Vitinya Tunnel, on the Hemus motorway was the longest road tunnel in the country for 40 years between its opening in 1984 and 2024. It has been surpassed by the Zheleznitsa Tunnel on the Struma motorway.
