= Padina =

Padina may refer to:

== Geography ==
=== In Bulgaria ===
- Padina, Kardzhali Province
- Padina, Silistra Province
- Padina, Varna Province

=== In Romania ===
- Padina, Buzău, a commune in Buzău County
- Padina, a village in Amărăști Commune, Vâlcea County
- Padina, a tributary of the river Lotru in Vâlcea County
- Padina Șirnii River, a headwater of the Padina Dâncioarei River, a headwater of the Dâmbovicioara River

=== In Serbia ===
- Padina (Kovačica), a Slovak-populated village in the region of Banat, Vojvodina
- Padina (Merošina), a village in Nišava District
- Padina (Belgrade), an urban neighborhood of Belgrade, in the municipality of Zvezdara

=== As a part of the name ===
==== In Antarctica ====
- Kresnenska Padina, a depression in Perunika Glacier in eastern Livingston Island

==== In Romania ====
- Pădina Mare, a commune in Mehedinţi County, and its village of Pădina Mică

==== In Serbia ====
- Sunčana Padina, an urban neighborhood of Belgrade, in the municipality of Čukarica
- Čukarička Padina, an urban neighborhood of Belgrade, in the municipality of Čukarica
- Vidikovačka Padina, a part of the urban neighborhood of Vidikovac in Belgrade

== Other ==
- Padina (alga), a genus of brown algae
