= Tisata =

Nature reserve in south-western Bulgaria

Tisata Nature Reserve
- IUCN category Ia (strict nature reserve)
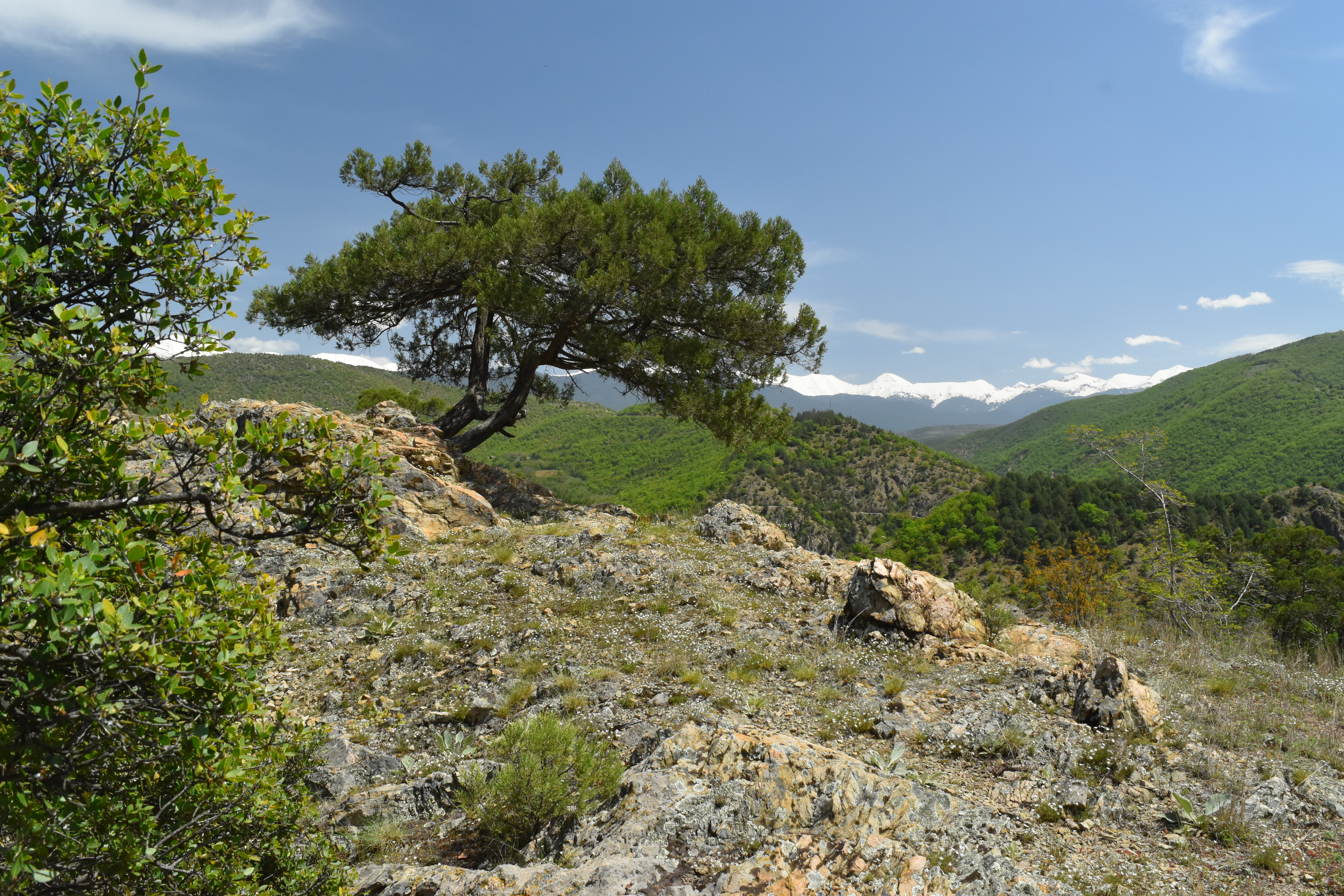

- Location within Bulgaria
- Location: Kresna Municipality, Blagoevgrad Province, Bulgaria
- Nearest city: Kresna
- Coordinates: 41°45′21.41″N 23°08′32.48″E
- Area: 5.85 km^{2} (2.26 sq mi)
- Established: 1949
- Governing body: Ministry of Environment and Water

Tisata (Bulgarian: Тисата [ˈtisɐtɐ]) is a nature reserve in south-western Bulgaria. It is situated in Kresna Municipality, Blagoevgrad Province. The reserve is managed by the administration of Pirin National Park despite the fact it lies outside the limits of the park.

== Statute and location ==
Tisata was declared a nature reserve by Order No. 6633 of the Ministry of Forestry on 5 December 1949 under the name Tisova Barchina to protect the largest natural habitat of Greek juniper (Juniperus excelsa) in Bulgaria. Initially it encompassed a territory of 19 ha but was expanded several times and nowadays occupies 584 ha or 5.84 km^{2}, as well as a buffer zone of 420 ha. The borders of the reserve were determined in 1991.

The territory of the reserve is divided into two separate sections by the southern reaches of the Kresna Gorge on the Struma River. The western section occupies the eastern slopes of the Maleshevo mountain range, while the eastern one is situated on the north-western slopes of the Pirin mountains. The altitude of the reserve ranges between 300 and 700 m. In terms of geology the most common rock type is gneiss. The climate is continental Mediterranean; the predominant soil type are leached cinnamon forest soils. The soils on the foothills of Pirin are partially exposed to erosion.

== Flora ==
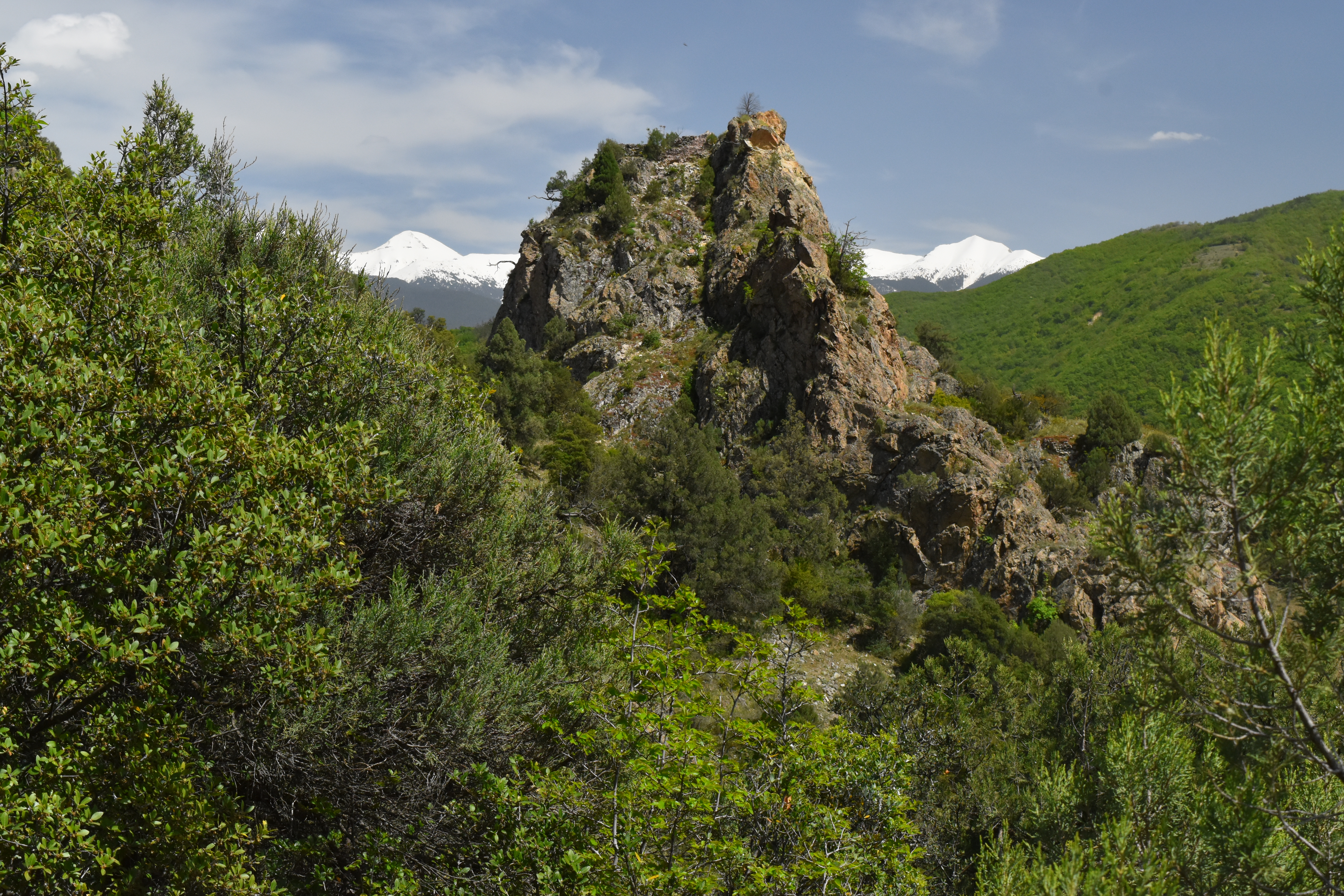
Predominantly evergreen sclerophyll vegetation in the Tisata Reserve

There are 460 species of vascular plants. About 80% of the reserve's territory is covered by forests dominated by Greek juniper, a relict species that evolved in Asia Minor. There trees are 10 to 15 m but some individuals can reach 20 m and a diameter of 1 m. The Greek juniper forms monotypic or mixed forests with trees such as Oriental hornbeam (Carpinus orientalis), pubescent oak (Quercus pubescens) and South European flowering ash (Fraxinus ornus). Rarer tree or large shrub species include Jerusalem thorn (Paliurus spina-christi) and prickly juniper (Juniperus oxycedrus). Another important tree species is the evergreen European yew (Taxus baccata).

There are a number of Mediterranean herbaceous plants such as Fritillaria graeca, Colchicum bivonae, Anemone pavonina, woodland tulip (Tulipa sylvestris), etc.

== Fauna ==
The fauna includes many species that are found in the southernmost regions of Europe. The ornithofauna is very diverse and includes 109 nesting species in the reserve's limited territory. There are 62 species of European conservation importance. In 1997 the reserve, the buffer zone and the Moravska protected area were declared a site of ornithological importance. Of the breeding bird species 30% are characteristic for the Mediterranean biome, including blue rock thrush, common rock thrush, western Orphean warbler, Sardinian warbler, eastern subalpine warbler, olive-tree warbler, eastern black-eared wheatear, black-headed bunting, masked shrike, western rock nuthatch, rock partridge, etc. Important birds of prey include short-toed snake eagle and Eurasian eagle-owl.

The herpetofauna is also varied and includes 11 snake species, such as European ratsnake, Dahl's whip snake, European cat snake, four-lined snake and European blind snake, and two turtle taxa, spur-thighed tortoise and Hermann's tortoise.
