= Bulgaria bus crash =

Bulgaria bus crash may refer to:

- 2009 Yambol bus crash, 18 people killed after a bus crashed into people walking from an Ascension Day feast
- 2021 Bulgaria bus crash, 45 people killed after a bus crashed on a motorway at night
