= Vlahina reka =

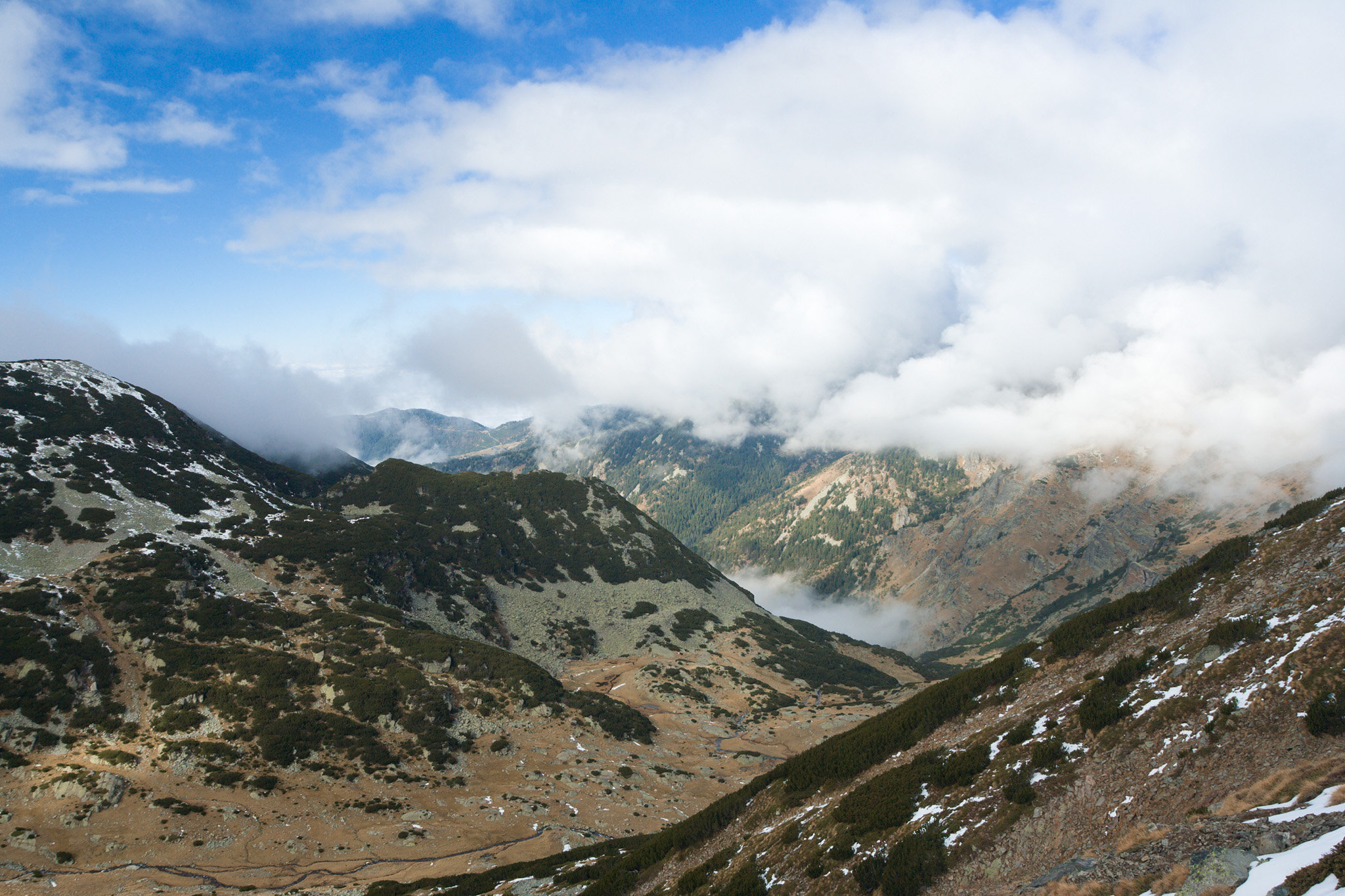
- The upper valley of Vlahina reka in Pirin

Location
- Country: Bulgaria

Physical characteristics
- Source
  - location: Vlahini Lakes, Pirin
  - coordinates: 41°45′15.84″N 23°23′21.12″E
  - elevation: 2,302 m (7,552 ft)
- Mouth
  - location: Struma River
  - coordinates: 41°43′49.08″N 23°9′19.08″E
  - elevation: 180 m (590 ft)
- Length: 27 km (17 mi)
- Basin size: 108 km^{2} (42 sq mi)

Basin features
- Progression: Struma→ Aegean Sea

The Vlahina reka (Bulgarian: Влахина река) is a river in south-western Bulgaria, a left tributary of the Struma. The river is 27 km long and drains part of the western sections of the Pirin mountain range.

The river takes its source from the south-eastern corner of the highest of the five Vlahini Lakes in Northern Pirin at an altitude of 2,302 m to the southwest of Pirin's highest summit Vihren (2,914 m). It flows westwards in a glacial valley; after the Gredaro ridge it turns southwest in a heavily forested in region. Following the village of Vlahi, the river flows in western direction. It flows into the Struma at an altitude of 180 m near the town of Kresna.

The catchment area of the river is 108 km^{2}, or 0.62% of Struma's total.

Vlahina reka has predominantly snow-rain feed with high water in late spring (May) and low water in summer (August). The average annual flow at the confluence with the Struma is 1.69 m^{3}/s, although during snowmelt the amount of water may increase tenfold to 14.6 m^{3}/s.

The only settlement along the river is Vlahi in Kresna Municipality, Blagoevgrad Province, from which its name originated. The river's waters are utilised for irrigation and water supply of the municipal center Kresna and several villages.
