= Zheleznitsa =

Zheleznitsa (Bulgarian: Железница) may refer to the following places in Bulgaria:

- Zheleznitsa, Blagoevgrad Province
- Zheleznitsa, Sofia City Province
- Zheleznitsa Tunnel
