= Sinanishko Lake =

Glacial lake in the Pirin mountain range, southwestern Bulgaria

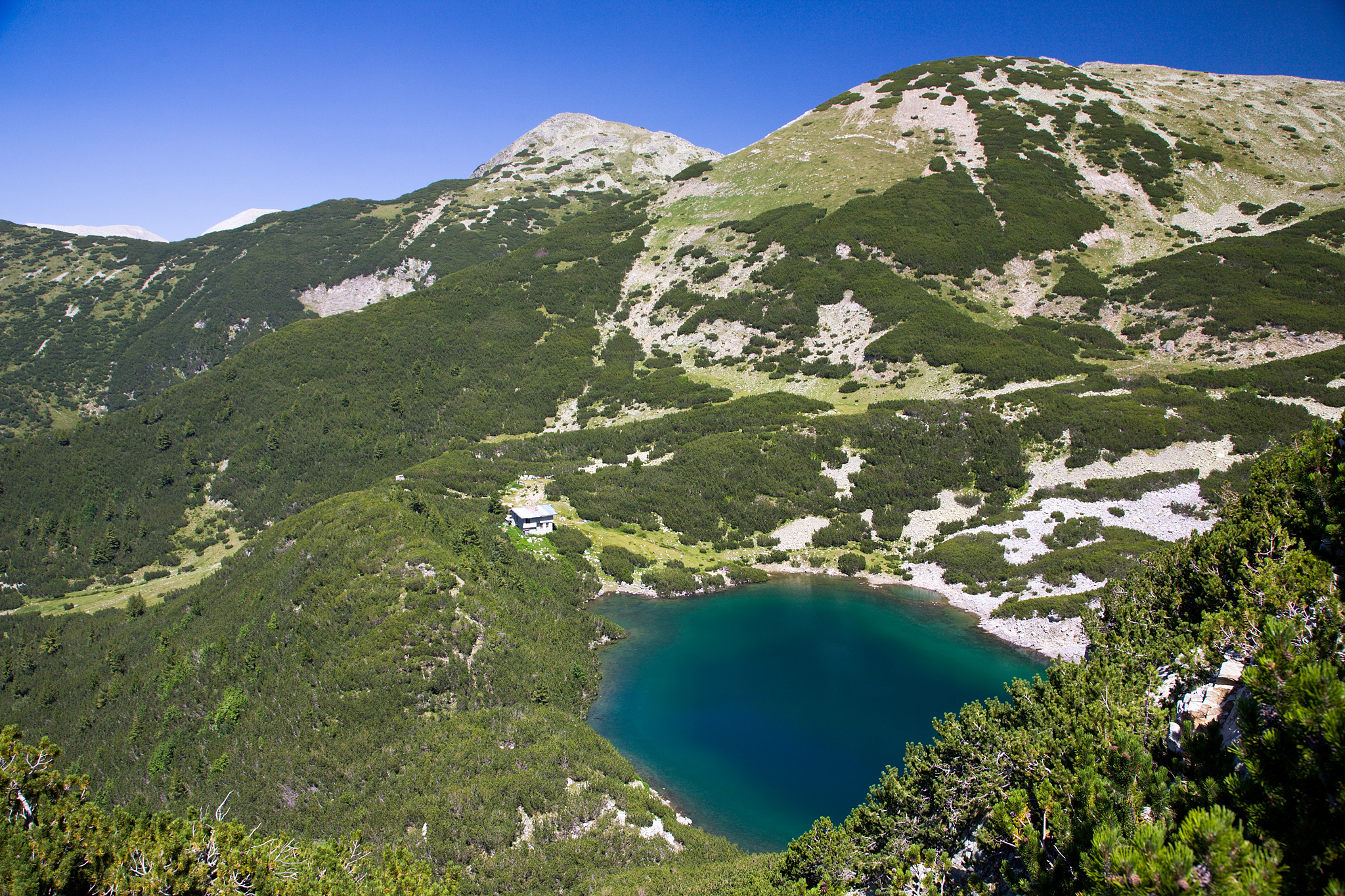

- Location within Bulgaria
- Location: Pirin
- Coordinates: 41°43′53″N 23°21′43″E
- Primary outflows: underground
- Basin countries: Bulgaria
- Max. length: 175 m (574 ft)
- Max. width: 80 m (260 ft)
- Surface area: 10,100 m^{2} (109,000 sq ft)
- Max. depth: 11.5 m (38 ft)
- Surface elevation: 2,181 m (7,156 ft)

The Sinanishko Lake (Bulgarian: Синанишко езеро) is a glacial lake in the Pirin mountain range, southwestern Bulgaria, situated about 700 m to the north–northeast of the summit of Sinanitsa (2,516 m) in the small Sinanitsa cirque at an altitude of 2,181 m. Reaching depth of 11.5 m, it is among the ten deepest lakes in the mountain range. It has an elongated shape with maximum length of 175 m and a width of 80 m. The surface area is 10,100 m^{2}. Its waters pour out under the ground and they appear on the surface 120 m away from the lake and form the beginning of the river Sinanishka, a left tributary of the Vlahina reka of the Struma river basin. Close to its northern shores is located the Sinanitsa refuge.

== Gallery ==
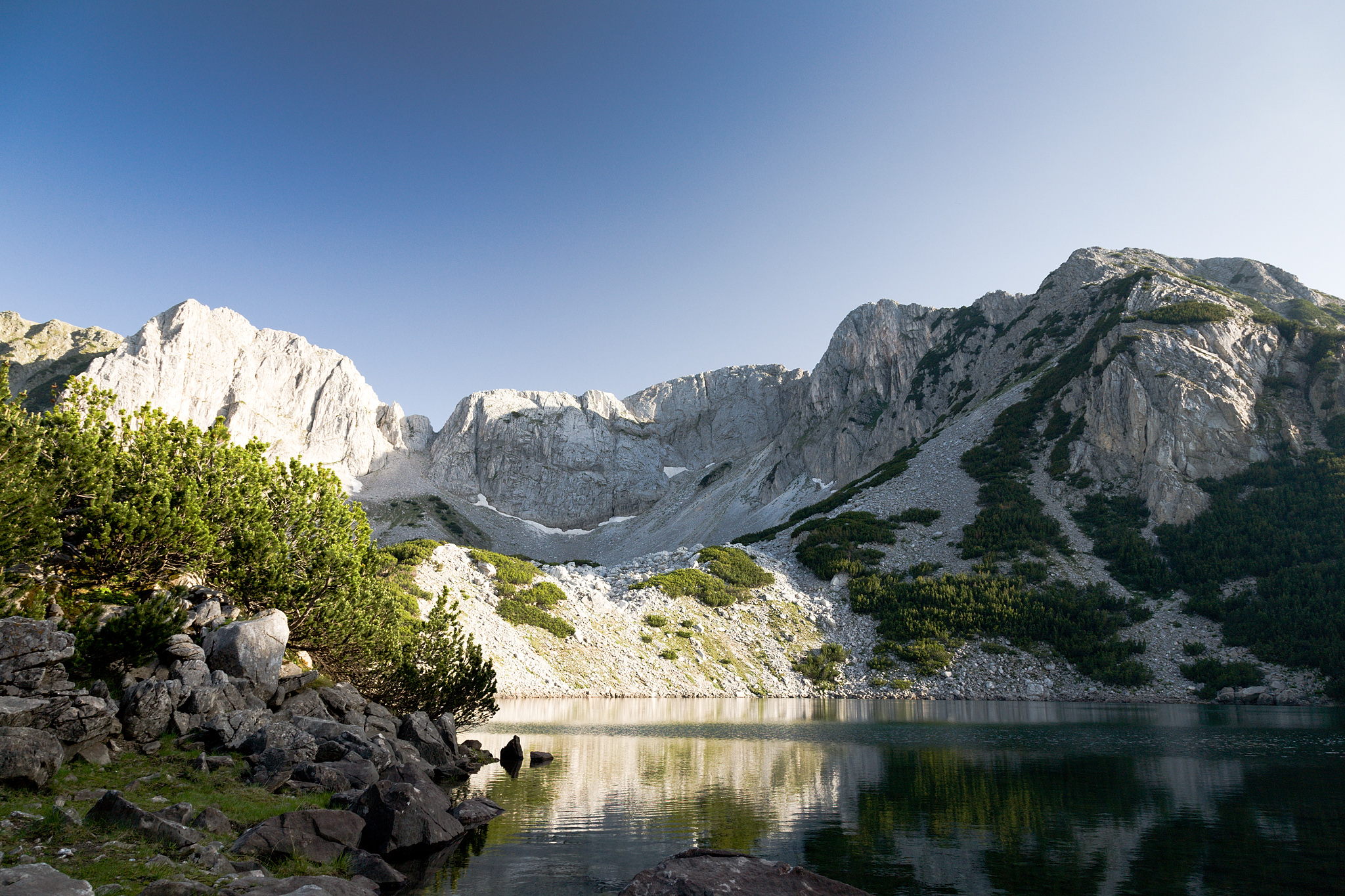

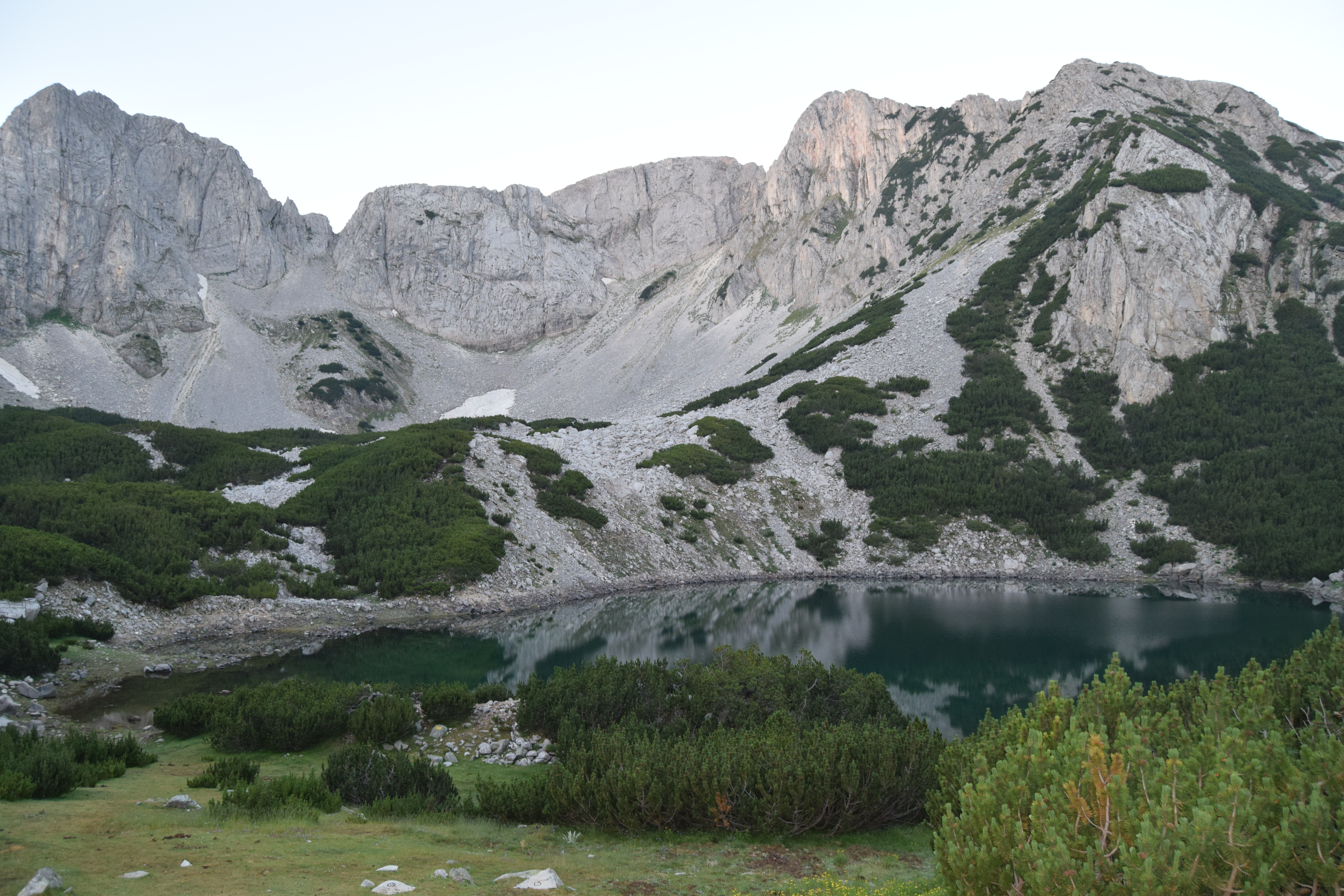

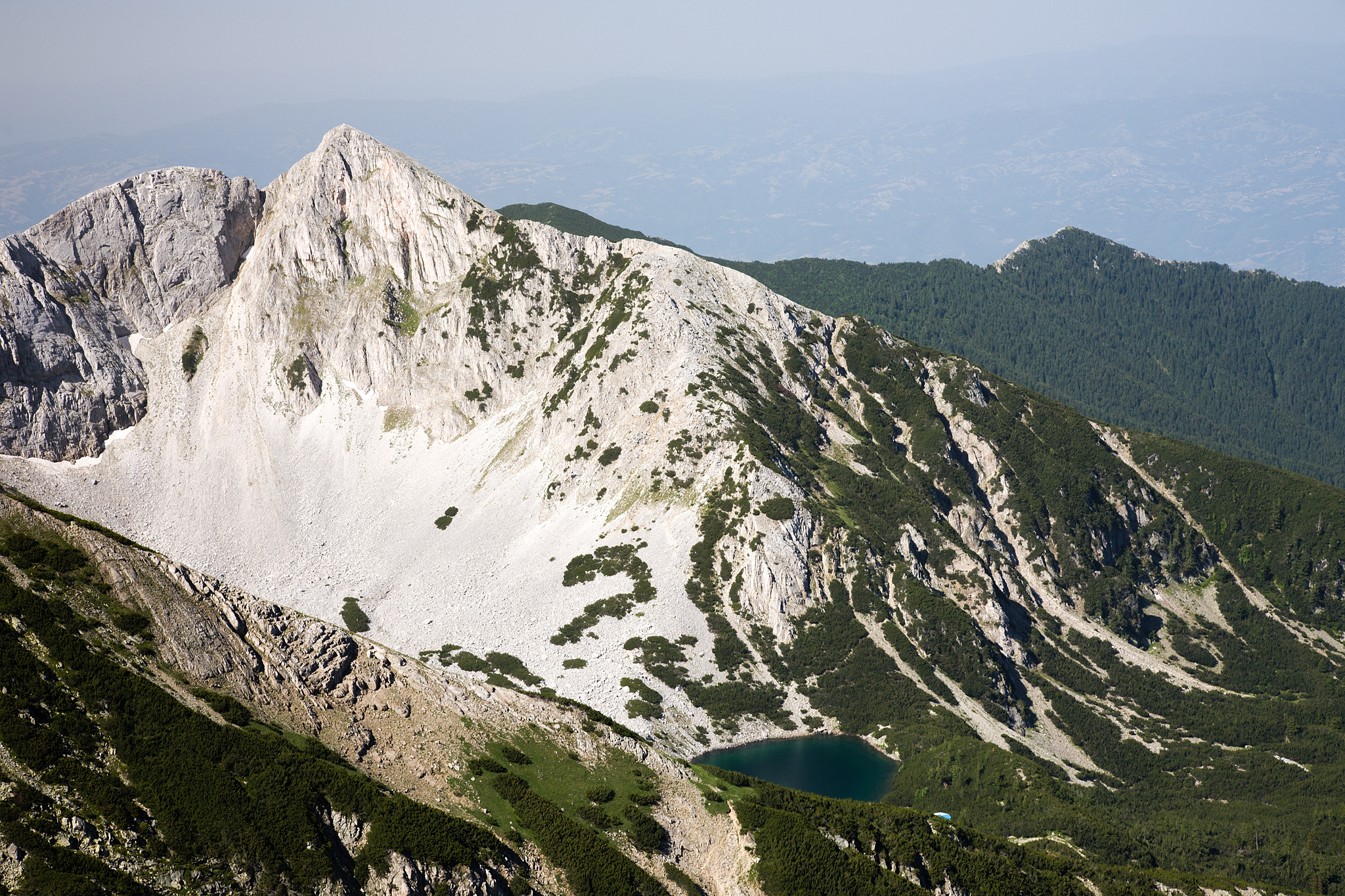

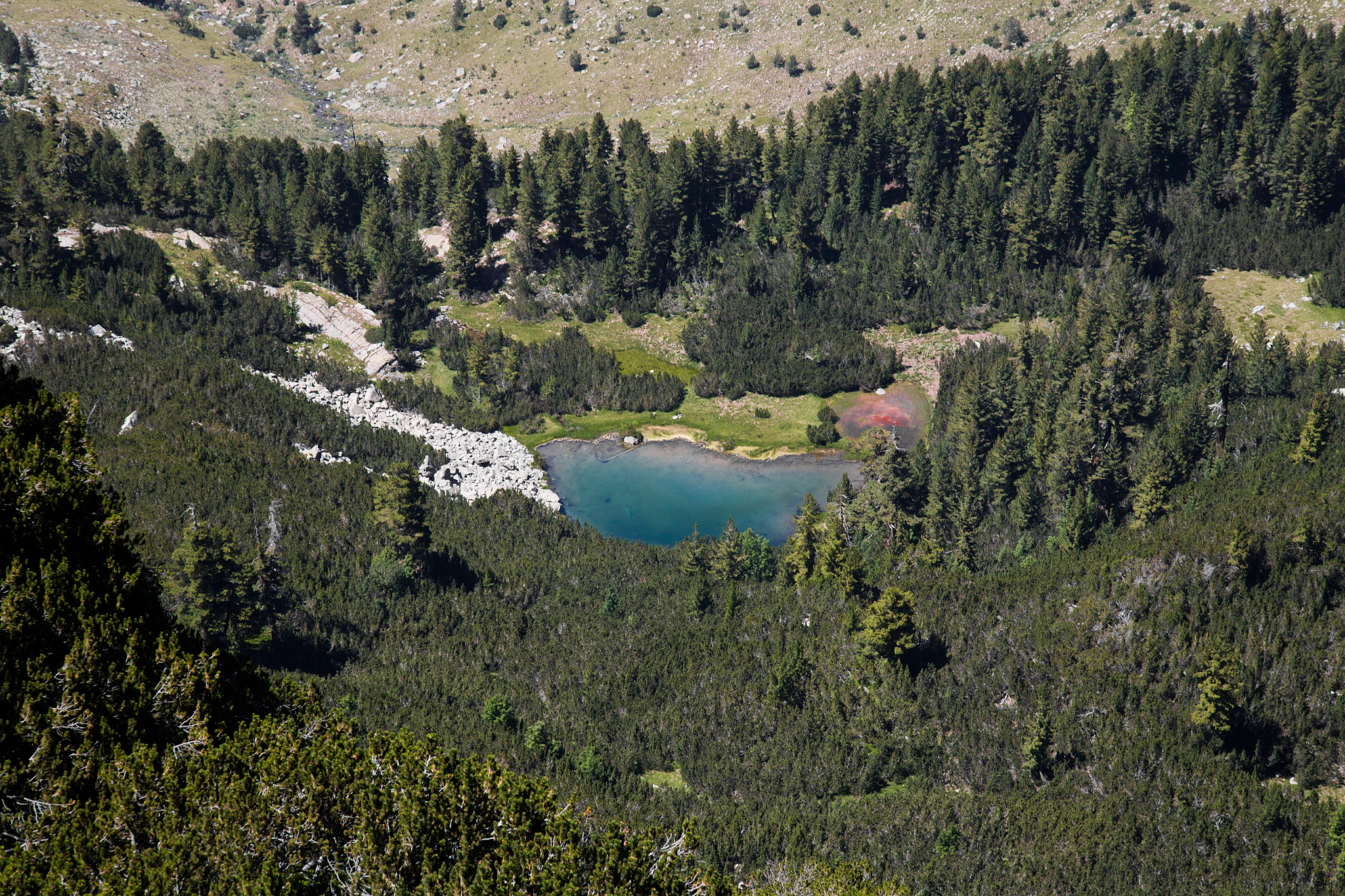
