= Ezerets =

Ezerets may refer to the following places in Bulgaria:

- Ezerets, Blagoevgrad Province
- Ezerets, Dobrich Province
