= Stara Kresna =

- Village
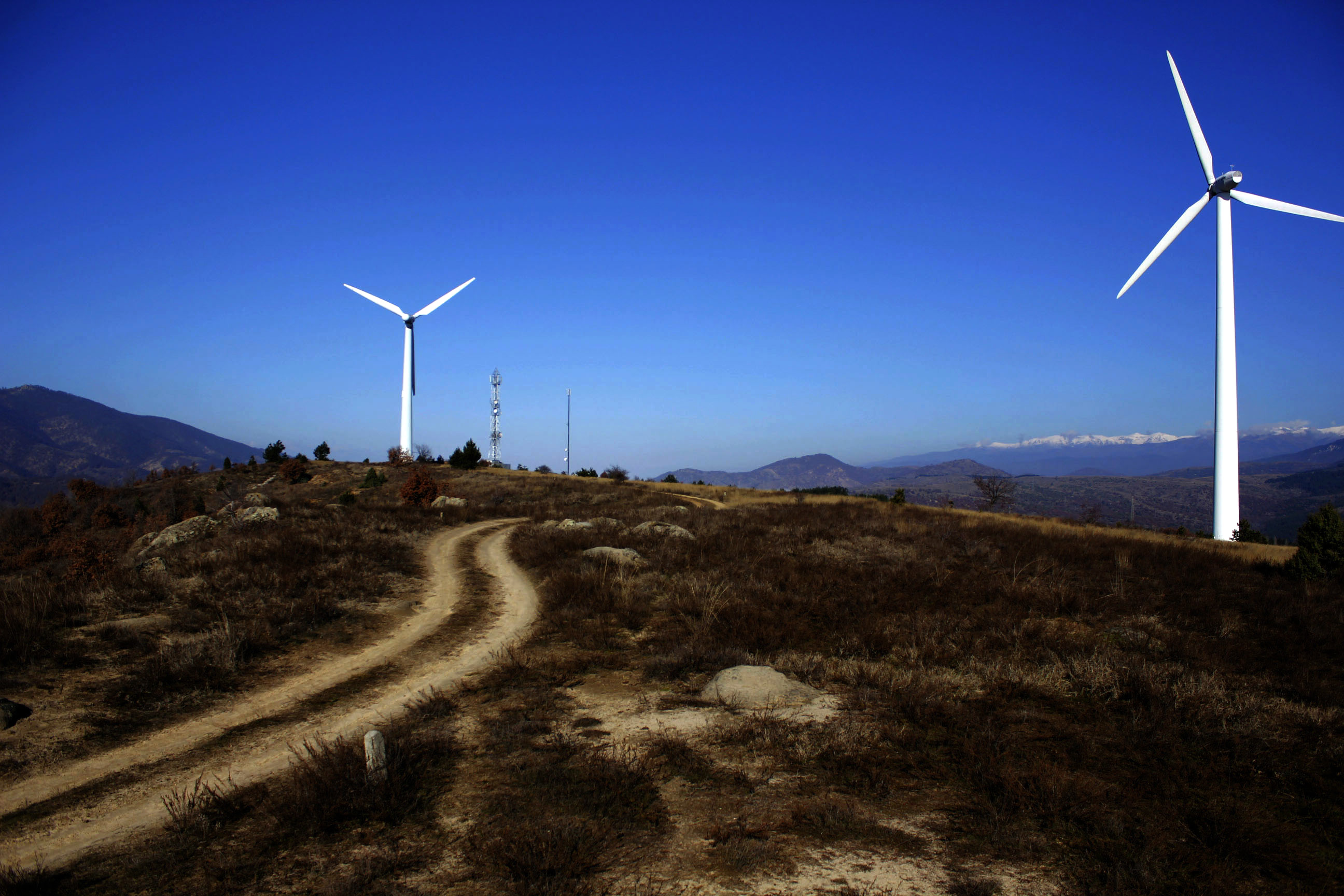
- A hill with wind turbines near Stara Kresna

- Location within Bulgaria
- Coordinates: 41°48′N 23°11′E
- Country: Bulgaria
- Province: Blagoevgrad Province
- Municipality: Kresna Municipality

Area
  - Total: 19.169 km^{2} (7.401 sq mi)
- Elevation: 409 m (1,342 ft)

Population (2010)
  - Total: 89
- Time zone: UTC+2 (EET)
  - Summer (DST): UTC+3 (EEST)

Stara Kresna is a village in Kresna Municipality, in Blagoevgrad Province, Bulgaria.
