= Zheleznitsa Tunnel =

Road tunnel in Bulgaria

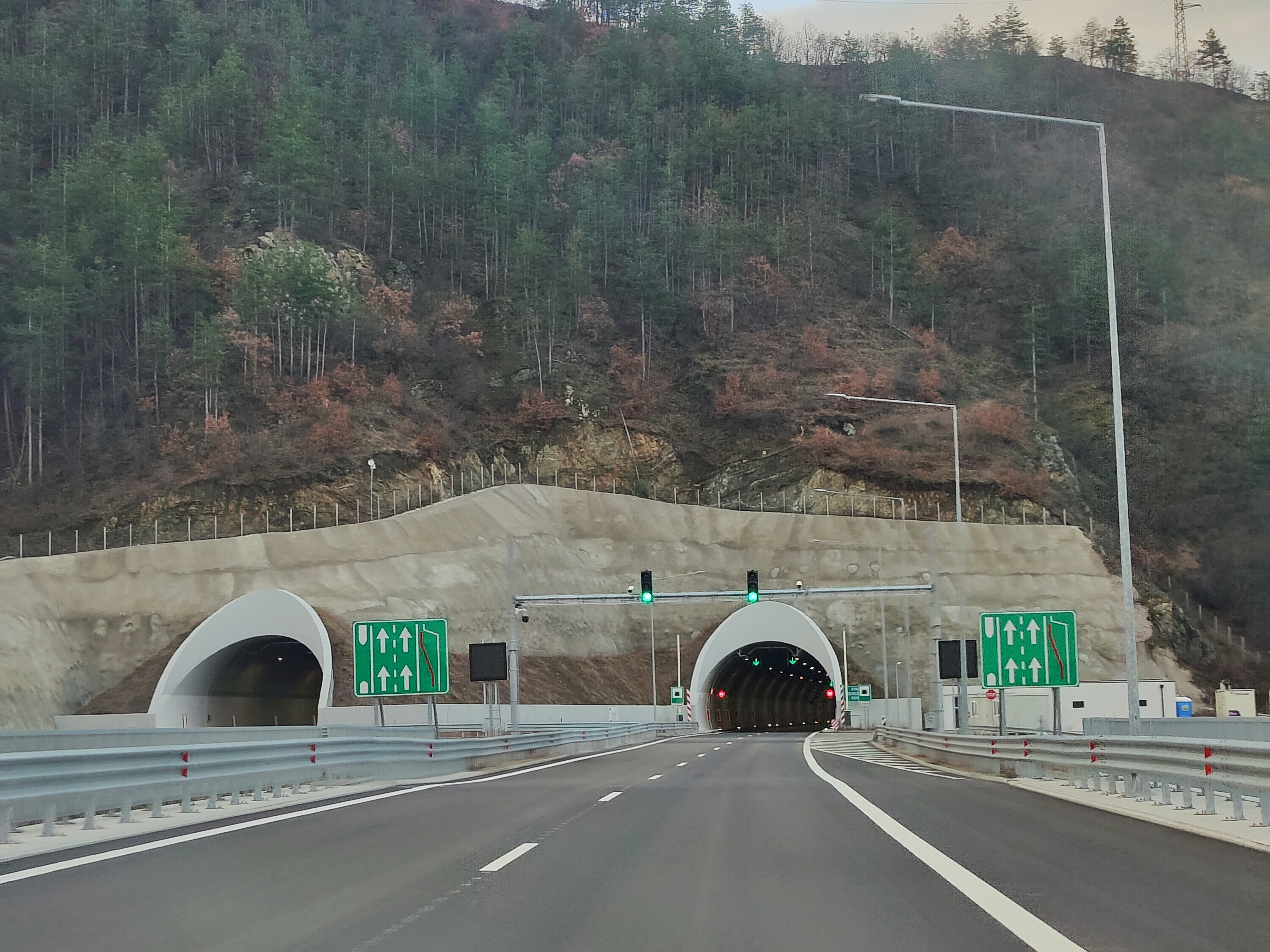
- North entrance
- Interactive map of Zheleznitsa Tunnel

Overview
- Official name: тунел „Железница“
- Location: Blagoevgrad Province, Bulgaria
- Coordinates: 41.9427°N 23.1068°E
- Status: Operational
- Start: Zheleznitsa
- End: Simitli

Operation
- Work began: 2019
- Opened: 20 February 2024
- Owner: Road Infrastructure Agency of the Republic of Bulgaria
- Traffic: automotive
- Character: Twin-tube motorway tunnel

Technical
- Length: 2,000 m (6,600 ft)
- No. of lanes: 2×2

The Zheleznitsa Tunnel (Bulgarian: тунел „Железница“) is a 2-kilometre (1.2 mi) highway twin tunnel on the Struma motorway (European route E79) in Blagoevgrad Province, southwestern Bulgaria. It is the longest road tunnel in Bulgaria. The tunnel is named after the village of Zheleznitsa, which it bypasses between the towns of Blagoevgrad and Simitli.

Construction of the tunnel began in October 2019 and it was planned for completion in 2022. However, the activation of landslides delayed the opening to February 2024 and increased the total cost to almost 400 million leva (200 million euro).

The Zheleznitsa Tunnel is a critical section of the Struma motorway, linking the Bulgarian capital Sofia with the Greek Aegean port of Thessaloniki. Built using the New Austrian tunneling method, it was opened for traffic on 20 February 2024.

The tunnel features four pedestrian crossings and two car crossings between the twin tubes. Its construction as part of a 5-kilometre (3.1 mi) highway section also included a medevac helicopter pad, a service road and two bridges.

== See also ==
- List of tunnels in Bulgaria
- Kresna Gorge Tunnel
