= Sinanitsa =

Marble peak in the northern part of the Pirin Mountains of southwestern Bulgaria

Sinanitsa (Синаница)
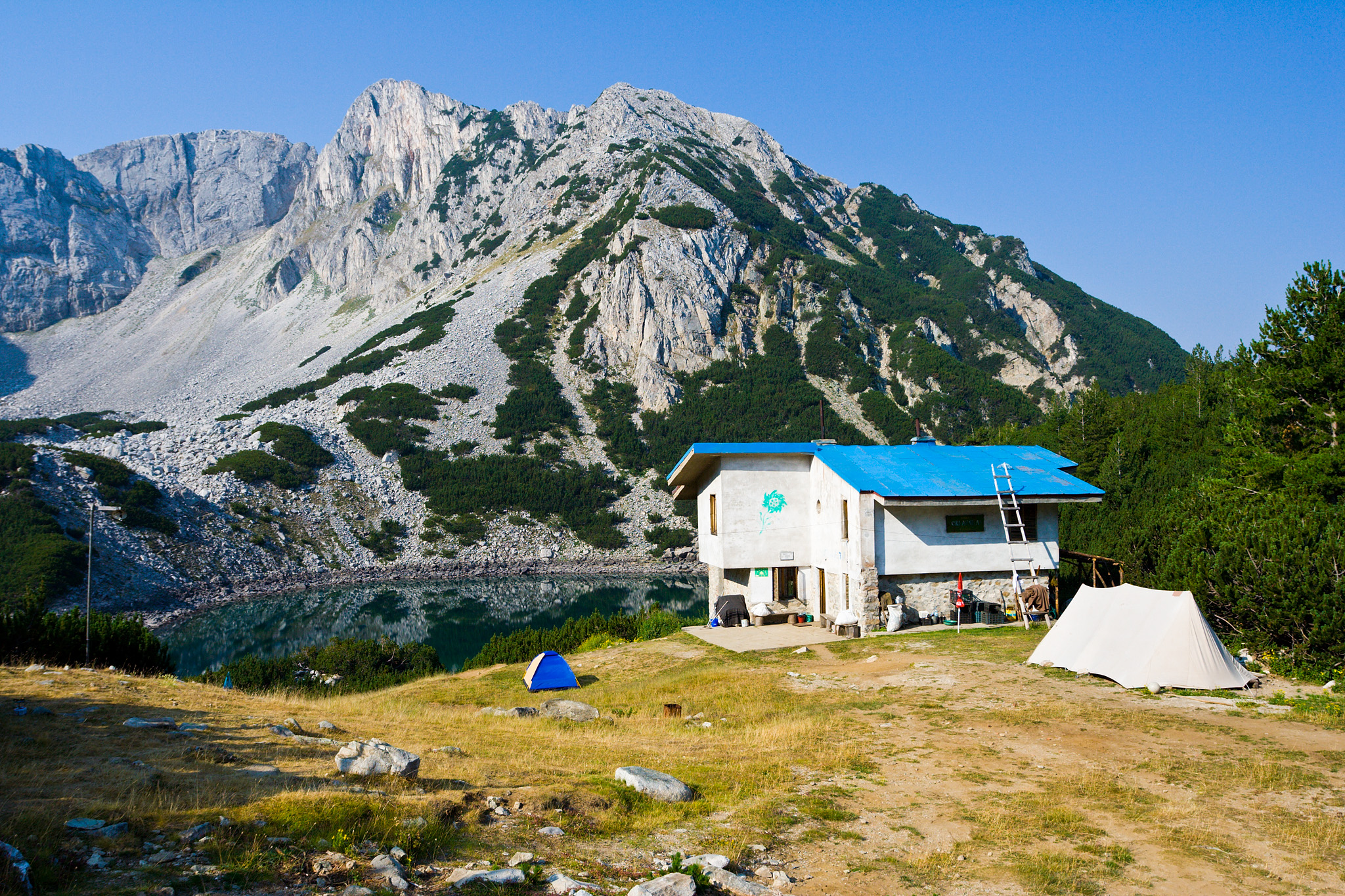
- Sinanitsa Peak towering above the eponymous cirque lake and hut in the foreground

Highest point
- Elevation: 2,516 metres (8,255 feet)
- Coordinates: 41°43′33.1″N 23°21′30.06″E

Geography
- Location: Blagoevgrad Province, Bulgaria
- Parent range: Pirin Mountains

Climbing
- Easiest route: From Sinanitsa Hut

Sinanitsa (Bulgarian: Синаница [siˈnanit͡sɐ]) is a marble peak in the northern part of the Pirin Mountains of southwestern Bulgaria. 2,516 metres (8,255 feet) high, Sinanitsa gives its name to the Sinanitsa Lateral Ridge, one of the four best pronounced lateral ridges in Pirin. Sinanitsa is also known as Chukata (Чуката [ˈt͡ʃukɐtɐ]), Varovita Chuka (Варовита чука [vɐroˈvitɐ ˈt͡ʃukɐ]) or The Split Peak (Разцепения връх, Raztsepenia vrah [rɐsˈt͡sɛpɛnijɐ ˈvrɤx]), the latter because of its unusual south face.

Though it gives its name to the entire ridge due to its characteristic shape, the "enchantingly beautiful" Sinanitsa is in fact lower than the ridge's highest point, Gergiytsa, which measures 2,589 m (8,494 ft) metres and lies to the northwest. Sinanitsa is commonly regarded as one of the most beautiful peaks in Pirin and Bulgaria. On clear days, the summit is easily visible from the town of Sandanski.

The etymology of Sinanitsa's name is debated. It stems either from the Bulgarian word for "blue" (син, sin), due to the peak appearing in that colour from a distance, or from the Arabic word sinan (سنان). The latter would describe it as a "spearhead" peak, referencing its sharp contours.

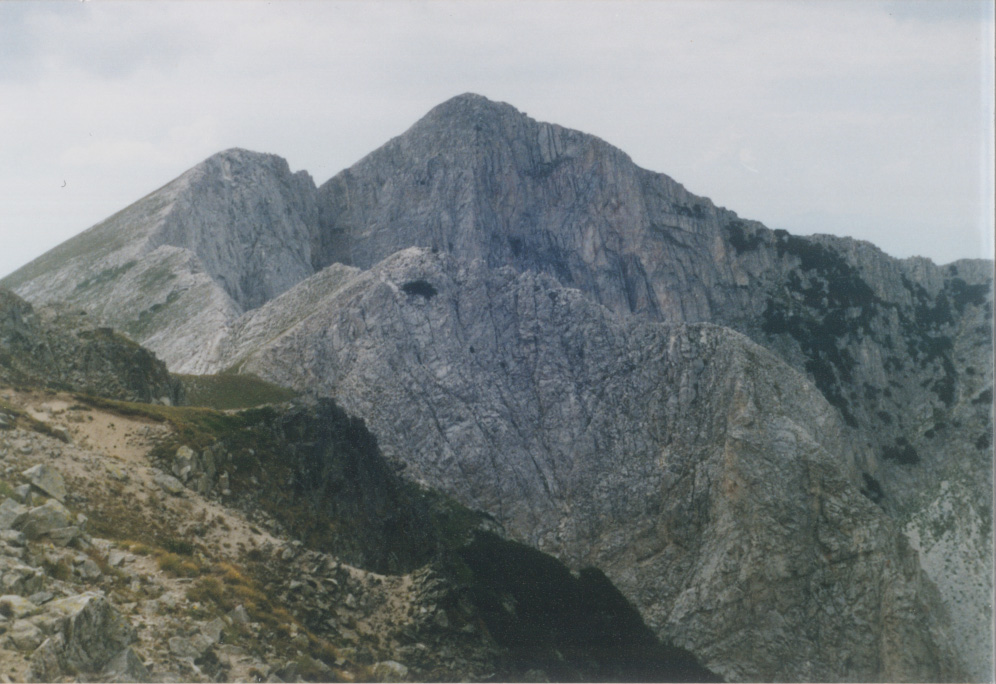
View of the summit from the Sinanitsa Gate

The Sinanishko Lake lies in the eponymous cirque to the north-northwest of Sinanitsa, at 2,181 m (7,156 ft). The Sinanitsa River, a tributary of the Vlahinska River that subsequently flows into the Struma, originates from the lake's underground waters. The Sinanitsa Gate is a steep and rocky col on the ridge connecting the Sinanitsa cirque with the Spano Pole cirque to the southeast. The Sinanitsa Hut is situated by the shores of the lake, within direct view of the summit. The summit can be reached in approximately an hour from the hut.

Sinanitsa's steep eastern face is a popular destination for alpine climbing. The route follows a vertical wall around 200 m (660 ft) high, with a climbing grade of 4b. It was first scaled by Andrey Todorov and Vasil Nastev on 12 July 1949; the first winter ascent was accomplished on 27 April 1955 by Encho Petkov and Yordan Machirski.
