= Slivnitsa (village) =

- Village
- Location within Bulgaria
- Coordinates: 41°41′30″N 23°10′00″E
- Country: Bulgaria
- Province: Blagoevgrad Province
- Municipality: Kresna Municipality
- Time zone: UTC+2 (EET)
  - Summer (DST): UTC+3 (EEST)

Slivnitsa (village) is a village in Kresna Municipality, in Blagoevgrad Province, Bulgaria.
