= Kresna Gorge Tunnel =

Planned tunnel in Blagoevgrad Province, Bulgaria

- Interactive map of Kresna Gorge Tunnel

Overview
- Location: Kresna Gorge, Bulgaria
- Coordinates: 41°46′7″N 23°9′18″E Kresna Gorge Tunnel (Bulgaria)
- Status: Cancelled
- Route: A 3 (Struma motorway), E79
- Start: Krupnik, Bulgaria
- End: Kresna, Bulgaria

Operation
- Operator: NCSIP
- Traffic: automobile
- Character: motorway, twin-tube
- Toll: no

Technical
- Length: 15.385 km (9.560 mi) east tube, 15.410 km (9.575 mi) west tube
- No. of lanes: 2 x 2

Kresna Gorge Tunnel was a planned twin-tube tunnel in Blagoevgrad Province, Bulgaria. The tunnel would have been part of Struma motorway (A3), that runs between Sofia and the border crossing to Greece, at the village of Kulata.

The proposed length of the tunnel of over 15 km would have placed it among the longest road tunnels in the world. The main reason to build a motorway tunnel of such length was to protect the environment in the Kresna Gorge.

The design works of the tunnel began in 2013. The construction was expected to begin in 2016, using the New Austrian Tunnelling method due to the diverse geology in the Kresna gorge, which makes the usage of TBM inapplicable. The construction costs along with the access roads were estimated at 1.1 billion levs (~560 million euro). As of 2015, plans were abandoned and an alternative route east of the gorge is being considered, which will involve a series of shorter tunnels and viaducts.
