= Struma motorway =

Motorway in Bulgaria

Struma motorway
- Автомагистрала „Струма“
- Struma motorway highlighted in red and yellow

Route information
- Part of E79
- Length: 143 km (89 mi) planned: 172 km (107 mi)

Major junctions
- From: Sofia
- To: Kulata, Greece

Location
- Country: Bulgaria
- Major cities: Sofia, Pernik, Dupnitsa, Blagoevgrad, Sandanski

Highway system
- Highways in Bulgaria

Pan-European corridor IV highlighted in red

The Struma Motorway (Bulgarian: Автомагистрала „Струма“, Avtomagistrala "Struma") is a motorway currently under construction in Bulgaria. The motorway is located in the Yugozapaden area in South West Bulgaria, and follows the route Sofia-Pernik-Dupnitsa-Blagoevgrad-Sandanski to Kulata on the border with in Greece. It is part of the Pan-European Corridor IV and also is part of Е79, that runs from Miskolc (Hungary) to Thessaloniki (Greece), via the Romanian cities of Deva and Craiova. This project is under the European Union's Ten-T Priority Projects. The road is also part of the proposed Via Carpatia route.

The Struma motorway forms a connection between Sofia and Kulata at the Bulgaria-Greece border with a total planned length of 172.8 km. As of February 2024, about 143km. of the motorway, from Sofia to Blagoevgrad, and from Kresna to Kulata have already been completed and are in service.

The highway has a total width of 29 m, it has two asphalt-surfaced lanes and one emergency halt lane in each direction and a 3.5m median dividing both carriageways.

The motorway is named after the Struma River. In 2018 the former Lyulin motorway was merged with the Struma motorway.

== History ==
The motorway has been divided into 5 construction lots: lot 0 from Pernik to Dolna Dikanya, lot 1 from Dolna Dikanya to Dupnitsa, lot 2 from Dupnitsa to Blagoevgrad, lot 3 from Blagoevgrad to Sandanski, and lot 4 from Sandanski to Kulata. The construction of lot 1 begun in September 2011 and was completed in July 2013. The construction of lot 2 begun in February 2013, and it was completed in October 2015. The construction of lot 4 begun in April 2012 and was completed in August 2015.

Due to its complexity and high construction cost lot 3 has been set back to the 2014–2020 financial period and only a conceptual design had been drafted. Furthermore, it has been divided into the three sub-lots 3.1 (Blagoevgrad-Krupnik), 3.2 (Krupnik-Kresna or Kresna Gorge) and 3.3 (Kresna-Sandanski).

The design and build contract for Lot 3.3 was signed on 25 September 2015. It was completed and entered into service on December 17, 2018 at the cost of 281 million leva (144.6 million €).

Lot 3.1 is 12.6 km in length, and it was estimated to cost 186 million leva. Construction started in August 2017, it partially opened on 23 May 2019 and after the Zheleznitsa Tunnel was finished, the remaining section opened on 17 February 2024 with final costs of over 400 million leva.

End of December 2018, the Bulgarian government decided to reorganize the motorway network and added the former motorway A6, the Lyulin motorway, as the northern extension to the Struma motorway and assigned the now vacant motorway number 6 to the new Europe motorway from Sofia towards the Serbian border at Kalotina.

== Lot 3.2. and Kresna Gorge environmental issue ==
Unlike Lots 3.1 and 3.3 the construction of Lot 3.2 is causing great controversy. Due to the mountain relief in this part of the country an economically viable motorway can only cut across the Kresna Gorge, a protected Natura 2000 site and a habitat of many flora and fauna endangered species. The existing roads in the Kresna Gorge already fragment it, and the current traffic, particularly on the major I-1 road cause the death of approximately 70 animals each day. Non-governmental organizations, including institutions such as Friends of the Earth Europe (FoEE), Balkani Wildlife Society, CEE Bankwatch Network, Green Policy Institute, and Centre for Environmental Information and Education, have all expressed concern through petitions, protests and studies, insisting the motorway must bypass the gorge in order to avoid further harm. Addressing all these concerns, in 2013 the government approved a 15-km long tunnel crossing the gorge to the west. The plan was met with an instant and stiff opposition from the local construction companies, and had since been shelved also due to concerns about the environmental impact of the construction works and the deposition of the excavated material from the tunnel, as well as worries about ballooning maintenance costs of the completed tunnel. An alternative plan splitting the carriageways was proposed instead. According to it the southbound carriageway would be built over the existing I-1 road, while the northbound one would be built eastwards of the gorge at the foot of the Pirin mountain. This plan, however, was also met with an opposition from the NGOs due to heavy traffic still remaining in the gorge. The plan was also opposed by hundreds small business owners whose livelihood would be affected by the decommissioning of portions of I-1 road and land expropriation.

In August 2022, the former Minister of Environment and Water Borislav Sandov stopped the project for the construction of the lot. According to him, this is necessary because the European Commission (EC) expects a new environmental impact assessment (EIA) and a new assessment of compatibility with the ecological network "Natura 2000" of the entire section to be made.

In February 2026, construction started on lot 3.2.2, the Kresna Bypass, which in future might become the south bound of the motorway. First 200m will be an upgrade of the existing road, before the new carriageway swings to the West, crosses Struma river twice, then the old road and Sofia-Kulata railway, followed by a bridge over river Vlahinska before entering the tunnels Kresna 1 (359m) and Kresna 2 (231m). The whole section surpasses the town in the East and links to the exisiting route at exit 128 Kresna. Construction is planned to be done within threeandahalf years, so the opening might be end of 2029. Costs for this section will be 570 million leva, about 292 million Euro.

== Financing ==
In 2012, the European Commission approved of a EUR 274 million contribution for the highway; the total investment is approximately EUR 324 million. The Liulyn Motorway was partially financed by The Instrument for Structural Policies for Pre-Accession (ISPA) and the Daskalovo-Dolna Dikanya section of the highway received a loan from the European Investment Bank (EIB).

The construction of the complete motorway is estimated to cost 1.2 billion €.

== Exits ==
Exit	km	Destinations	Lanes	Notes
	0.0	Sofia Ring Road		In service
	4.9	Malo Buchino		In service
	7.9	Malo Buchino (446m)		In service
	10.7	Lyulin (311m)		In service
	15.0	Golemo Buchino (480m)		In service
	18.9	Pernik - east, Kyustendil, Gyueshevo; Kumanovo (North Macedonia)		In service
	26.7	Studena		In service
	30.8	Bosnek		In service
	33.2	Staro selo		In service
	37.1	Dolna Dikanya		In service
	51.3	Dupnitsa - north, Sapareva Banya, Samokov, Borovets		In service
	56.2	Blatino (380m)		In service
	59.2	Dupnitsa - south, Kyustendil, Gyueshevo; Kumanovo (North Macedonia) Sapareva Banya, Samokov, Borovets		In service
	73.4	Boboshevo, Mursalevo, Rila Monastery		In service
	83.1	Kocherinovo (351m)		In service
	85.2	Blagoevgrad - north, Kocherinovo, Rila		In service
	90.8	Blagoevgrad		In service
	97.8	Blagoevgrad - south		In service
	100.2	Zheleznitsa (2 021m)		In service
	102.5	Zheleznitsa		In service
	104.0	Zheleznitsa		In service
	105.4	Simitli, Bansko		In service
Lot 3.2		Kresna Gorge		Planned
	122.7	(Interim exit at start of Kresna Bypass)	Single carriageway (future south bound)	Under construction
	124.8	Kresna 1 (359m)	Single carriageway (future south bound)	Under construction
	125.3	Kresna 2 (231m)	Single carriageway (future south bound)	Under construction
	128.0	Kresna		In service
	136.8	Strumyani		In service
	147.9	Sandanski		In service
	153.1	Petrich, Melnik		In service
	159.2	General Todorov		In service
	161.2	Marikostinovo		In service
	163.0	Petrich		In service
	168.5	Kulata; Thessaloniki, Athens (Greece)		In service

== Lyulin motorway ==
The Lyulin motorway (Bulgarian: Автомагистрала „Люлин“, Avtomagistrala "Lyulin") was a motorway in Bulgaria, that provided a link between the western arc of the Sofia ringroad and the Daskalovo interchange, at the town of Pernik, where it merged with Struma motorway (A3). The total length of the motorway was around 19 km (12 mi), which made it the shortest motorway in Bulgaria. It ran through mountainous terrain and needed several tunnels and many viaducts in order to avoid ecological, environmental and terrain issues.

On 8 August 2006, a contract for the construction of the motorway was signed with the Turkish consortium Mapa Cengiz for 137,381,785 euro. The construction began in 2007 and was scheduled to be finished in 38 months. However, in 2010 the initial deadline was postponed for May 2011 and the price rose to 185,000,000 euro. The Lyulin motorway was launched on 15 May 2011 and thus became the first fully operating motorway in Bulgaria.

The highway was named after the Lyulin Mountain through which it passed. The largest neighborhood of Sofia from which the highway started is also named Lyulin.

=== Incidents and accidents ===
On 17 April 2010, during construction of a concrete element of the motorway, the supporting structure holding an area where concrete was being poured collapsed, killing three workers and seriously injuring further 7. The incident occurred between 9:30pm and 10:00pm at the 13.7th kilometre of the motorway, near the village of Golyamo Buchino. Four workers were transported to Pirogov Hospital, whilst the remaining six were sent to hospital in Pernik, where two of the workers died. A third died the following day, also in Pernik. All of the casualties were working for the Turkish construction firm Mapa-Dzhengiz. A formal investigation into the cause of the accident has been launched.

On 23 November 2021, a North Macedonian bus carrying 52 passengers and 2 bus drivers crashed into a barrier on the motorway near the village of Bosnek, 44.2 km south from Sofia, while going back to the North Macedonian capital of Skopje from a weekend trip in Istanbul. The bus caught on fire before or after it crashed. 45 people, including 12 children, died in the crash, and 7 were hospitalized after escaping through the windows of the burning bus.

=== Gallery ===
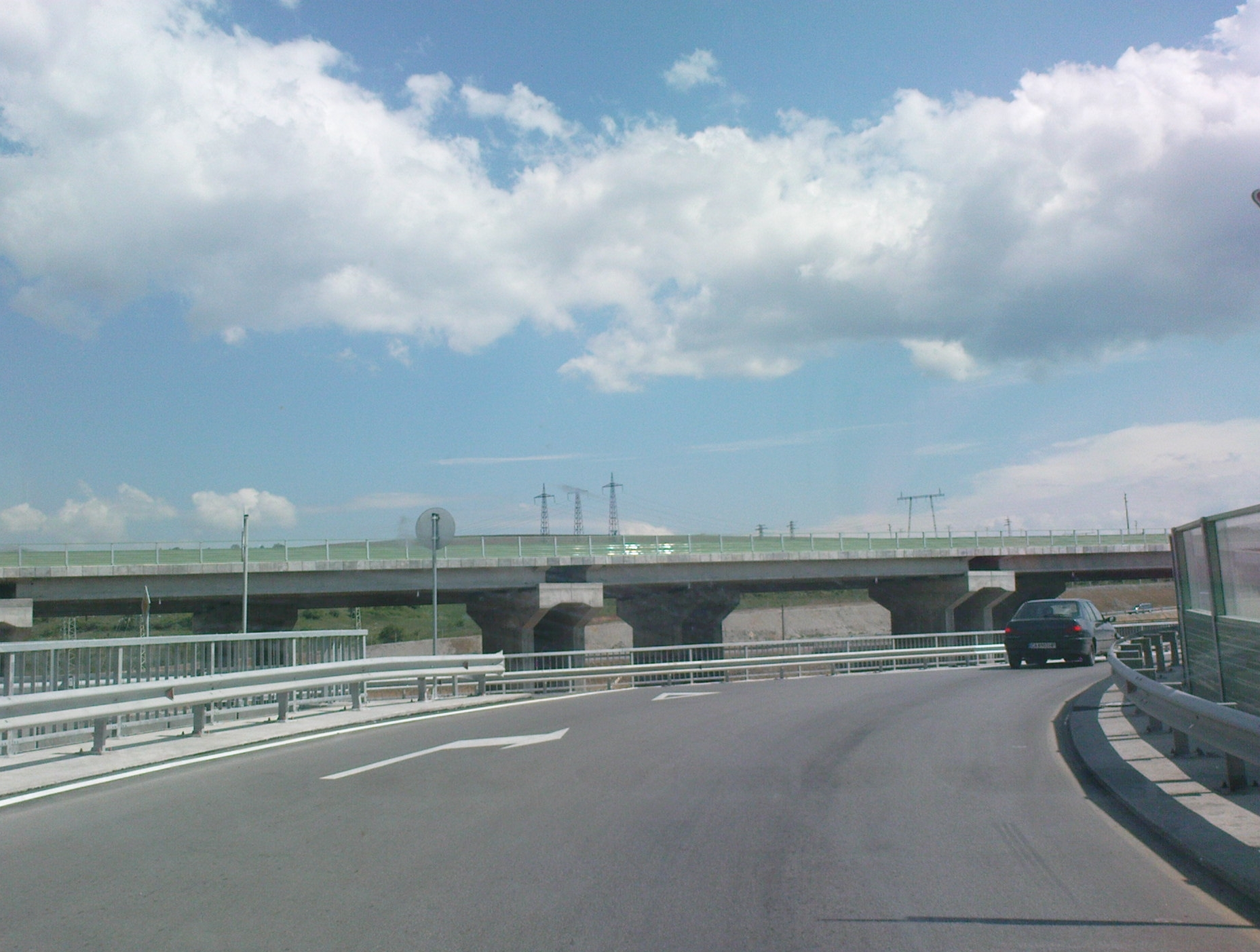
Entrance to Lyulin motorway from Pernik

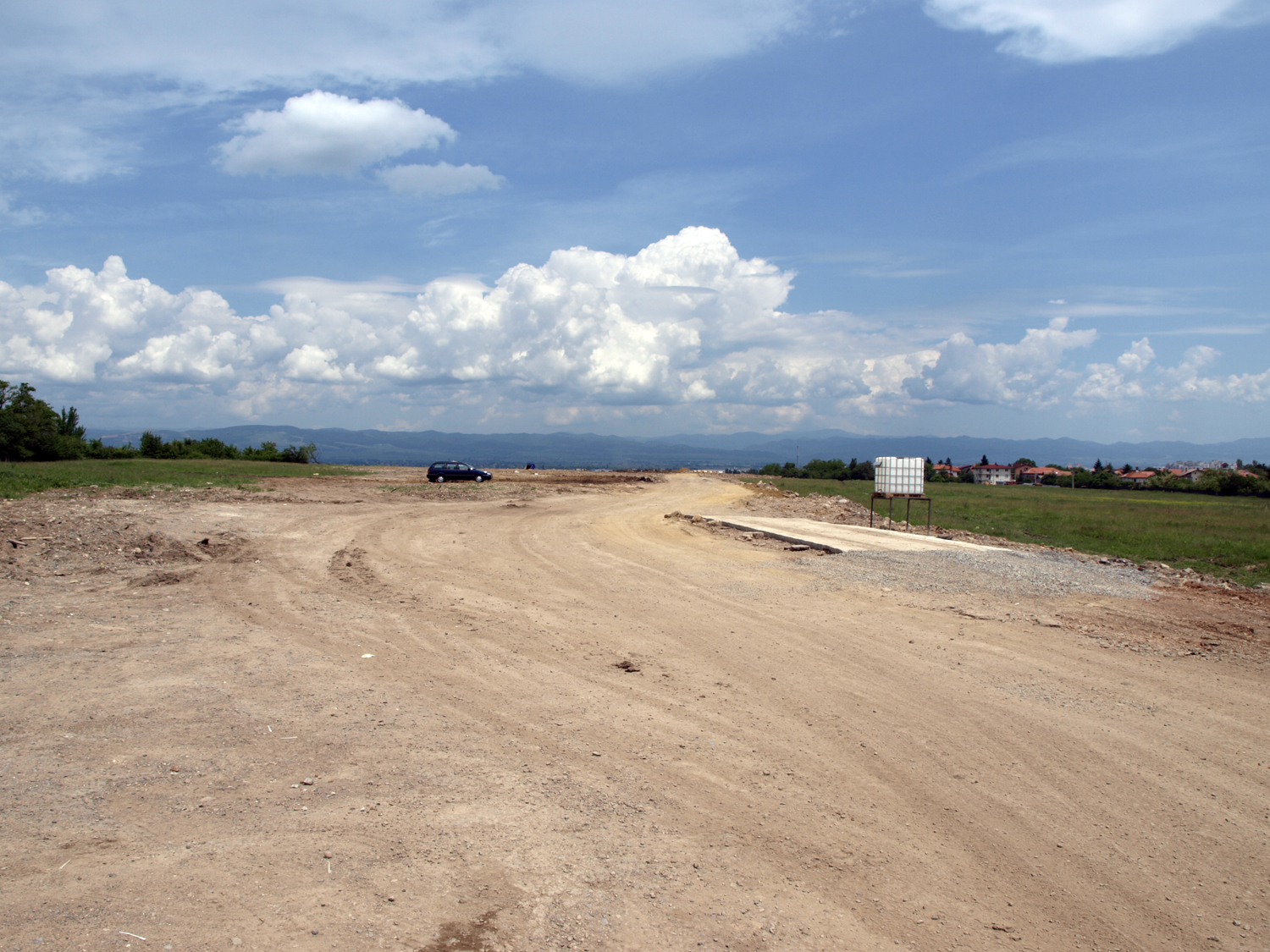
Motorway in May 2010 at Filipovtsi District, Sofia

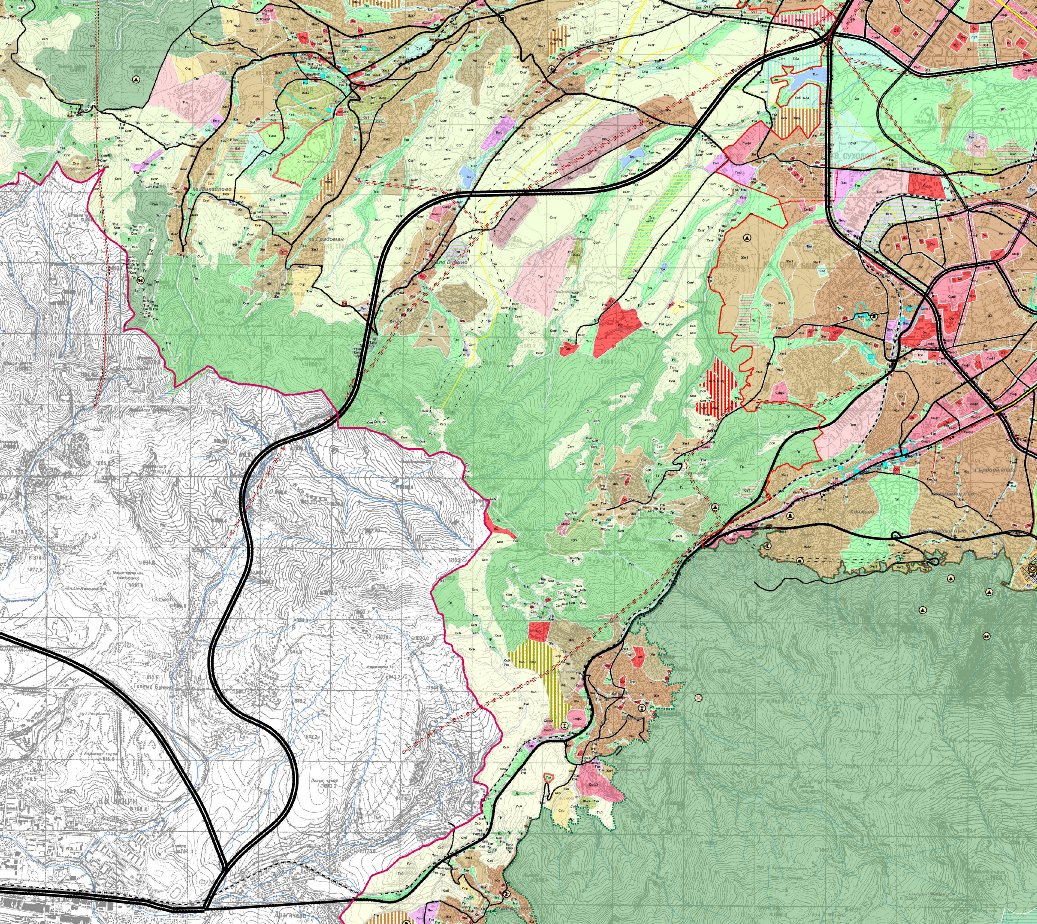
Road-bed

== Gallery ==
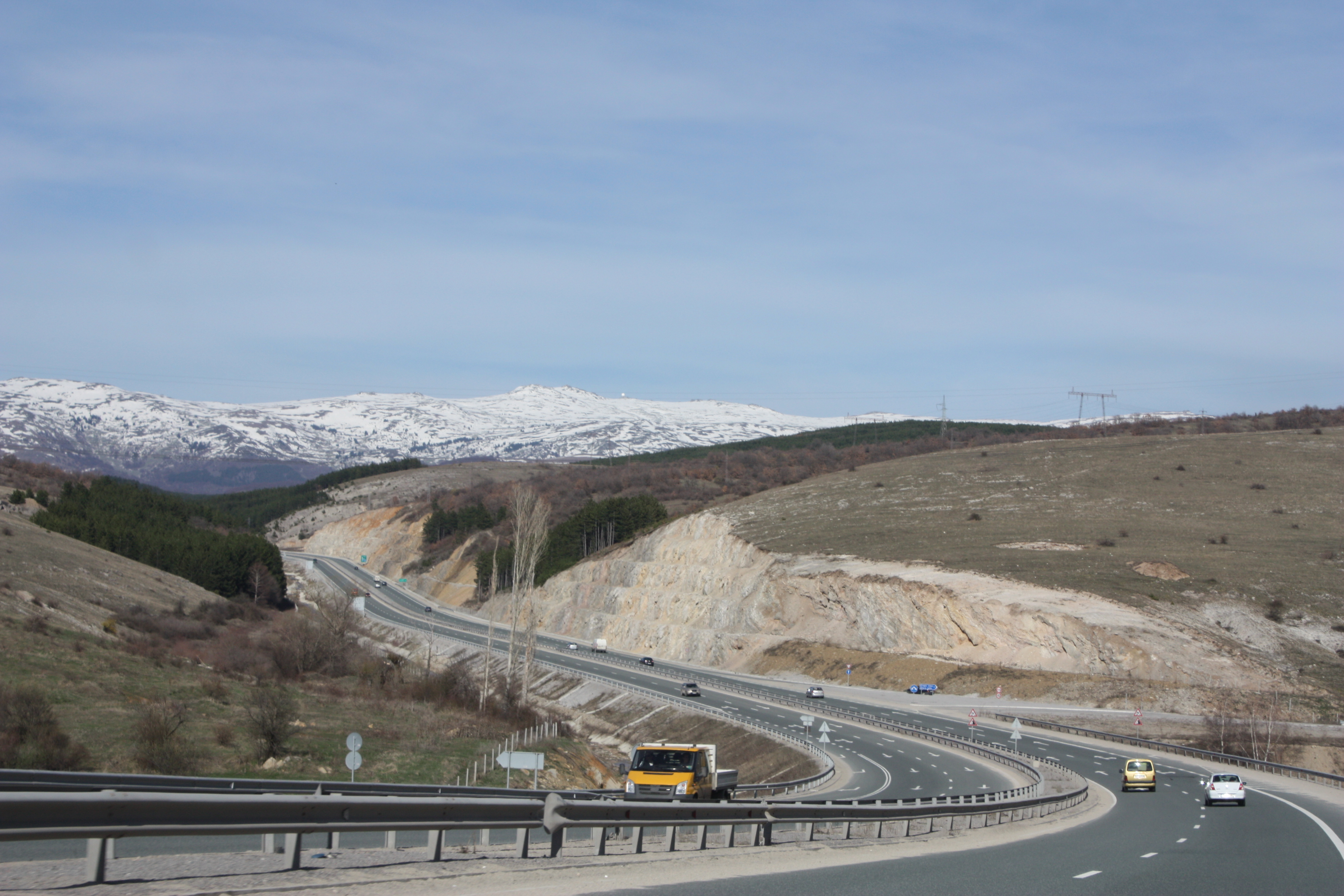
Struma motorway near Pernik
