= Padina (Merošina) =

Padina Падина
- Village
- Location within Serbia
- Coordinates: 43°19′35″N 21°37′48″E
- Country: Serbia
- District: Nišava District
- Municipality: Merošina
- Time zone: UTC+1 (CET)
  - Summer (DST): UTC+2 (CEST)

Padina is a village situated in Merošina municipality in Serbia.
