= Koznitsa (tunnel) =

Coordinates: 42°41′54″N 24°22′55″E

Overview
- Line: Sofia–Karlovo–Burgas

Operation
- Constructed: 1949–1951
- Opened: June 6, 1951
- Owner: National Railway Infrastructure Company

Technical
- Length: 5,808.5 m (19,057 ft)
- No. of tracks: single track
- Track gauge: 1,435 mm (4 ft 8 1/2 in) (standard gauge)
- Electrified: ~25 kV 50 Hz
- Max elevation: 818 m
- Min elevation: 798 m
- Grade: 2.0‰ / 6.4‰

Route map
- Koznitsa (tunnel) (Bulgaria)

Koznitsa (Bulgarian: Козница [ˈkɔznit͡sɐ]) is a railway tunnel under the Koznitsa ridge in the Stara planina (Balkan Mountains), the longest tunnel in Bulgaria. The tunnel is located between the Bulgarian railway stations of Koprivshtitsa and Stryama and is 5,808 m long.
