= 2021 Bulgaria bus crash =

Bus crash near Bosnek, Bulgaria

- Date: 23 November 2021
- Time: 02:00 (UTC+2)
- Location: Near Bosnek, Pernik Province, Bulgaria; 42°29′27″N 23°07′53″E
- Deaths: 45
- Injuries: 7

On 23 November 2021, at 2 a.m. local time, a Macedonian bus crashed and caught fire in western Bulgaria. The crash happened on the Struma motorway near the village of Bosnek, south-west of Sofia. Fifty passengers and two drivers were on the bus. Forty-five people died in the crash, including twelve children. Seven other passengers suffered burns but initially survived. It is currently the deadliest road accident in Bulgarian history, and has been referred to as the deadliest bus crash in Europe in a decade.

The Dolna Dikanya to Dragichevo section of the Struma Motorway was temporarily closed following the incident.

== Background ==
According to European Commission data, in 2019, Bulgaria had the second highest road fatality rate in the EU. After the crash, the mayor of the nearby town of Pernik told local media outlets that the motorway was in poor condition and accidents were frequent in the area.

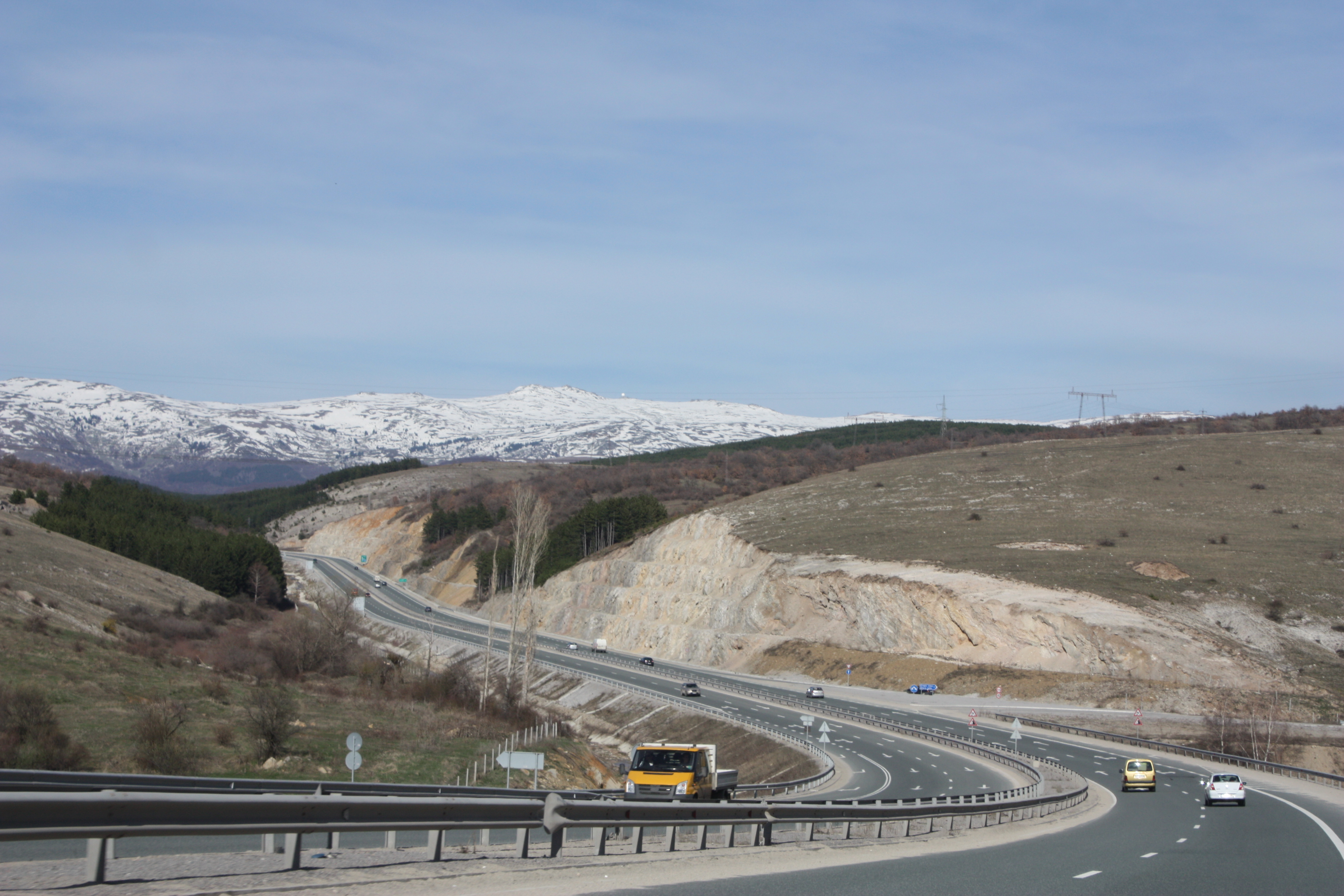
A section of the Struma motorway. The crash site is at the base of the furthest terraced hill.

== Crash ==
A bus carrying Macedonian tourists returning to the capital Skopje from a weekend holiday trip from Istanbul, registered under the tourist agency "Besa Trans", crashed on a motorway near the Bulgarian village of Bosnek around 02:00 local time. The vehicle hit a highway barrier either before or after it caught fire. A passenger later told reporters that he had been asleep and was woken by an explosion.

The Bulgarian Interior Minister Boyko Rashkov stated that victims' bodies were "clustered inside and are burnt to ash". According to Bulgaria's Deputy Prosecutor General Borislav Sarafov, the passengers were trapped inside the vehicle after it caught fire and died "mainly of suffocation." Seven passengers (five males and two females) managed to escape through windows with serious burns. All seven were hospitalised and later reported to be in stable condition.

The majority of the victims were Macedonian Albanians. Forty-four people were confirmed dead during the immediate aftermath of the crash, but after an additional search on 26 November, the body of a child was recovered, bringing the death toll to forty-five.

== Aftermath ==
Bulgarian caretaker Prime Minister Stefan Yanev described the crash as a tragedy, saying "[l]et's hope we learn lessons from this tragic incident and we can prevent such incidents in the future." The government declared Wednesday a National Day of Mourning for both victims of the crash and for the earlier deaths from a fire at a nursing home in Royak. Numerous politicians from various countries expressed their dismay at the loss of life.

The Macedonian government declared three national days of mourning for the bus crash. Officials stated that the most likely cause of the bus crash was due to human error. In March 2024, the owner of the company "Besa Trans" in North Macedonia was given a prison sentence of a year and eight months, a fine of 800,000 denars (13,000 EUR) and a four-year ban for international transport due to document falsification. On 8 January 2025, the Pernik District Court ruled that the Road Infrastructure Agency bears partial blame for the crash.

== See also ==
- 2009 Yambol bus crash
- Road safety in Europe
