= Vlahi (village) =

Vlahi Влахи
- Village
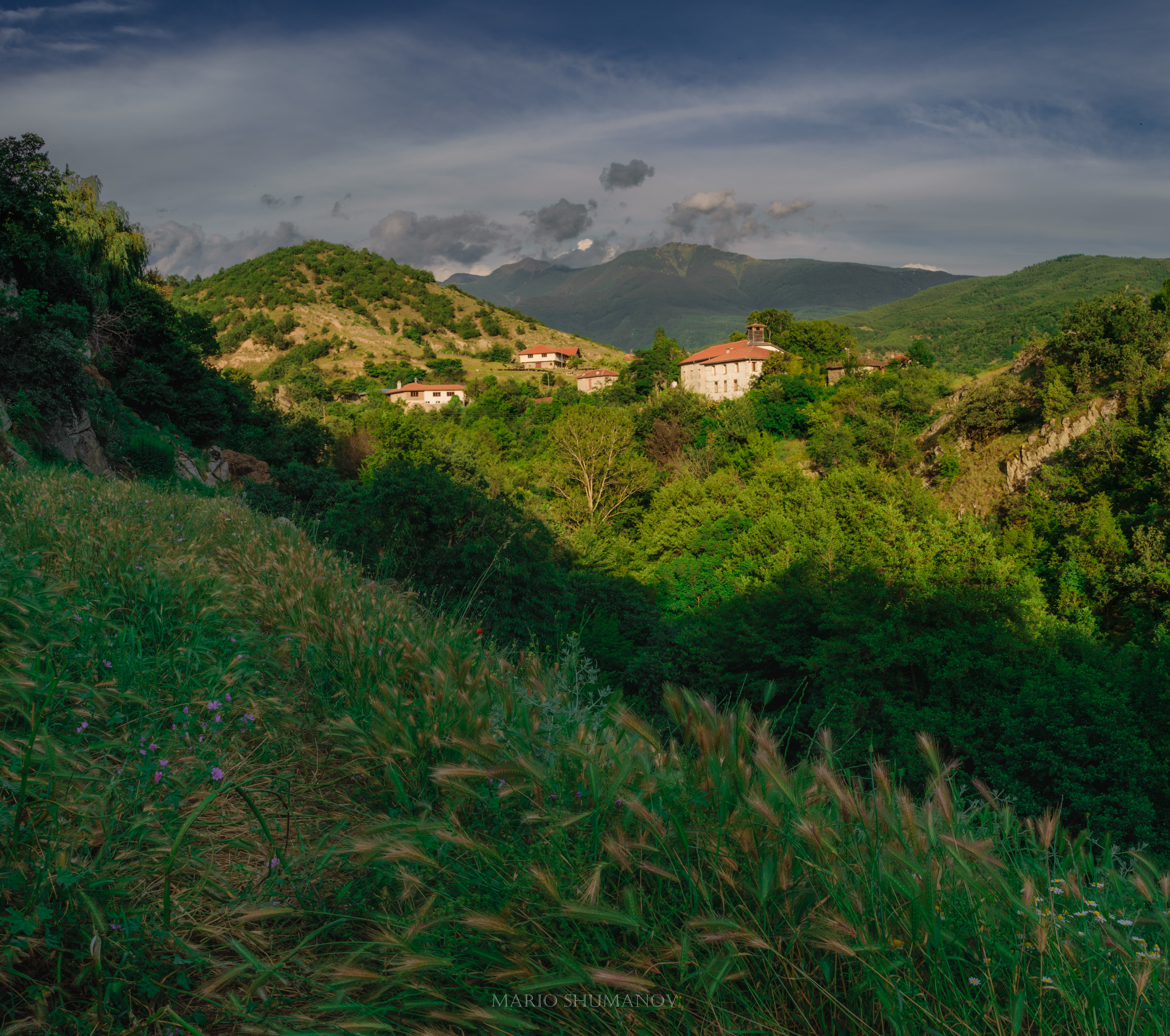
- Vlahi at sunset

- Location within Bulgaria
- Coordinates: 41°44′24″N 23°13′46″E
- Country: Bulgaria
- Oblast: Blagoevgrad
- Opština: Kresna

Government
  - Mayor (Municipality): Nikolay Georgiev (Ind.)

Area
  - Total: 12.537 km^{2} (4.841 sq mi)
- Elevation: 771 m (2,530 ft)

Population (2024)
  - Total: 10
- Time zone: UTC+2 (EET)
  - Summer (DST): UTC+3 (EEST)
- Postal code: 2841
- Vehicle registration: E

Vlahi (village) is a village in Kresna Municipality, in Blagoevgrad Province, Bulgaria. The etymology of the name Vlahi likely comes from the word Vlach, a minority ethnic group which do live all over the Balkan region.

== Notable people ==
- Yane Sandanski
