= Ezerets, Blagoevgrad Province =

Ezerets Езерец
- Village
- Location within Bulgaria
- Coordinates: 41.7928°N 23.2542°E
- Country: Bulgaria
- Province: Blagoevgrad Province
- Municipality: Kresna

Population (2011)
  - Total: 5
- Time zone: UTC+2 (EET)
  - Summer (DST): UTC+3 (EEST)

Ezerets is a village in Kresna Municipality, Blagoevgrad Province, Bulgaria.

Ezerets Knoll on Graham Land, Antarctica is named after the village.
