= Kresna Gully =

Depression in Livingston Island, Antarctica

Location of Livingston Island in the South Shetland Islands.

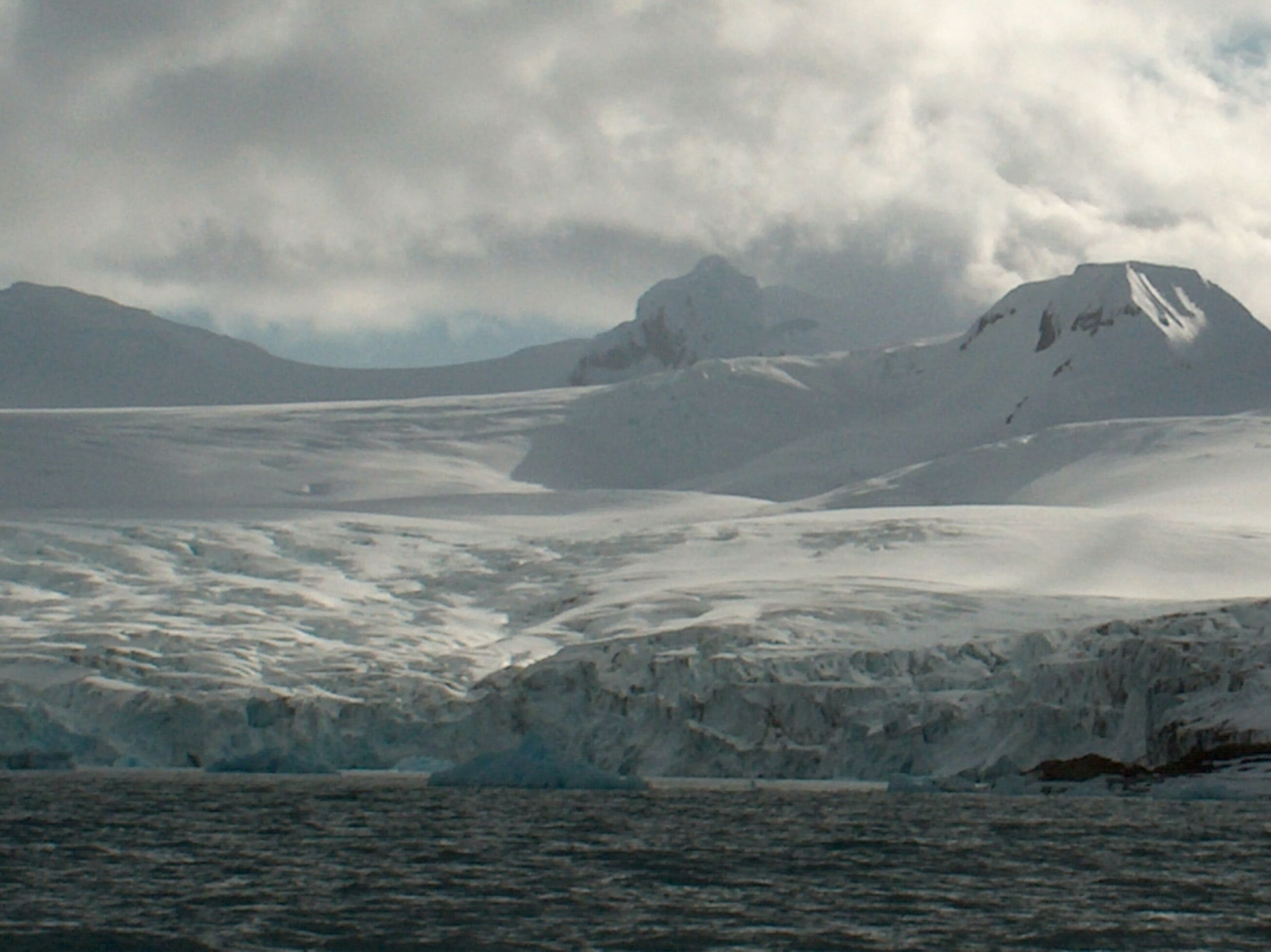
Kresna Gully from Emona Anchorage, with Rezen Knoll on the right.

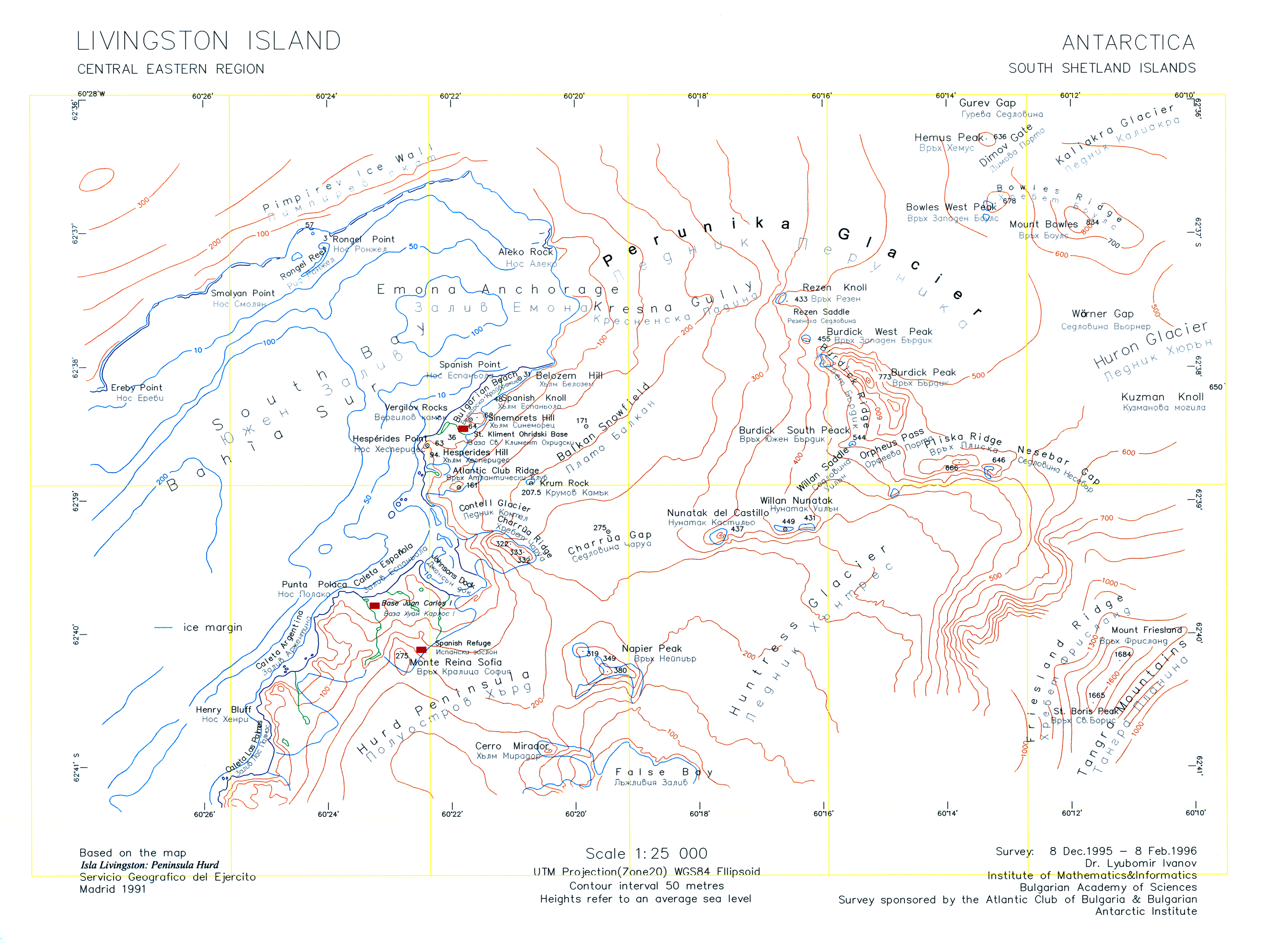
Topographic map of central-eastern Livingston Island featuring Kresna Gully.

Topographic map of Livingston Island and Smith Island.

Kresna Gully (Kresnenska Padina \'kre-snen-ska pa-'di-na\) is a heavily crevassed depression in Perunika Glacier extending 2.25 km westwards from Rezen Knoll in eastern Livingston Island in the South Shetland Islands, Antarctica. The gully ends in the indentation forming the east corner of Emona Anchorage, and located 3.15 km northeast of Hespérides Point 1.21 km south-southeast of Aleko Point.

Kresna is the name of a town and a gorge formed by the Struma River in south-western Bulgaria.

== Location ==
The midpoint is located at 62°37′33″S 60°18′10″W (Detailed Spanish mapping of the area by the Servicio Geográfico del Ejército in 1991. Bulgarian remapping in 1996, 2005 and 2009 of Perunika Glacier's terminus from 1995/96 and 2004/05 topographic surveys).

== Maps ==
- Isla Livingston: Península Hurd. Mapa topográfico de escala 1:25000. Madrid: Servicio Geográfico del Ejército, 1991. (Map reproduced on p. 16 of the linked work)
- L.L. Ivanov. Livingston Island: Central-Eastern Region. Scale 1:25000 topographic map. Sofia: Antarctic Place-names Commission of Bulgaria, 1996.
- L.L. Ivanov et al. Antarctica: Livingston Island and Greenwich Island, South Shetland Islands. Scale 1:100000 topographic map. Sofia: Antarctic Place-names Commission of Bulgaria, 2005.
- L.L. Ivanov. Antarctica: Livingston Island and Greenwich, Robert, Snow and Smith Islands. Scale 1:120000 topographic map. Troyan: Manfred Wörner Foundation, 2009. ISBN 978-954-92032-6-4
- Antarctic Digital Database (ADD). Scale 1:250000 topographic map of Antarctica. Scientific Committee on Antarctic Research (SCAR). Since 1993, regularly upgraded and updated.
- L.L. Ivanov. Antarctica: Livingston Island and Smith Island. Scale 1:100000 topographic map. Manfred Wörner Foundation, 2017. ISBN 978-619-90008-3-0
