= Zheleznitsa, Blagoevgrad Province =

Zheleznitsa
- Village
- Location within Bulgaria
- Coordinates: 41°55′26″N 23°06′25″E
- Country: Bulgaria
- Province: Blagoevgrad Province
- Municipality: Simitli Municipality
- Time zone: UTC+2 (EET)
  - Summer (DST): UTC+3 (EEST)

Zheleznitsa is a village in Simitli Municipality, in Blagoevgrad Province, in southwestern Bulgaria.

The Zheleznitsa Tunnel on the Struma motorway, Bulgaria's longest road tunnel, bypasses the village.
