= 2009 Yambol bus crash =

Bus crash

Yambol bus crash Автобусна катастрофа край Ямбол
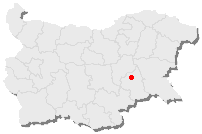
- Location of Yambol in Bulgaria

Details
- Date: 28 May 2009
- Location: Road to Bakadzhik peak near Yambol, Bulgaria

Statistics
- Deaths: 18
- Injured: 20+

The 2009 Yambol bus crash occurred on 28 May 2009 near the city of Yambol in southeastern Bulgaria. Eighteen people died, and around twenty were injured. The driver was among the wounded, and died in prison during his ten-year sentence.

== Crash ==
The victims had been walking up the Bakadzhik peak to attend a traditional Ascension Day (Spasovden) feast and fair held on the summit. Around 9:15 AM local time the bus, a Chavdar 11M4 operated by the Yambol transport company MCI Slavi Slavov, crashed into them while descending from the Alexander Nevsky Memorial Church located at the summit

The bus had been declared roadworthy on 12 May. The driver, 60-year-old Gospodin Gospodinov, was legally sober. He was seriously injured and treated at Pirogov Hospital in Sofia.

Most of the victims were over 60 years old, as well as one 16-year-old boy. Thirteen dead were women and five were men, all were from Yambol or nearby villages. Twenty people were injured, four initially in critical condition due to head trauma.

== Reaction ==
29 May was declared a national day of mourning in Bulgaria. Political parties paused their European Parliament election campaigns for the next few days. The National Assembly of Bulgaria observed a minute of silence as the news broke out. President Georgi Parvanov and Prime Minister Sergei Stanishev changed their schedules and visited the scene of the accident.

== Investigation ==
Post-crash inspection revealed that the bus had numerous technical deficiencies. Its brakes provided only 23% brake force; nails, wire, and a coin were found to have been used to carry out repairs on the bus.

In 2012, bus driver Gospodin Gospodinov and bus owner Slavi Slavov were each sentenced to ten years in prison. Gospodinov died in prison a few months later, while Slavov absconded until his January 2018 capture. The workshop that declared the bus roadworthy did not face any legal consequences.

== See also ==
- 2021 Bulgaria bus crash
