= Amărăști =

- Commune
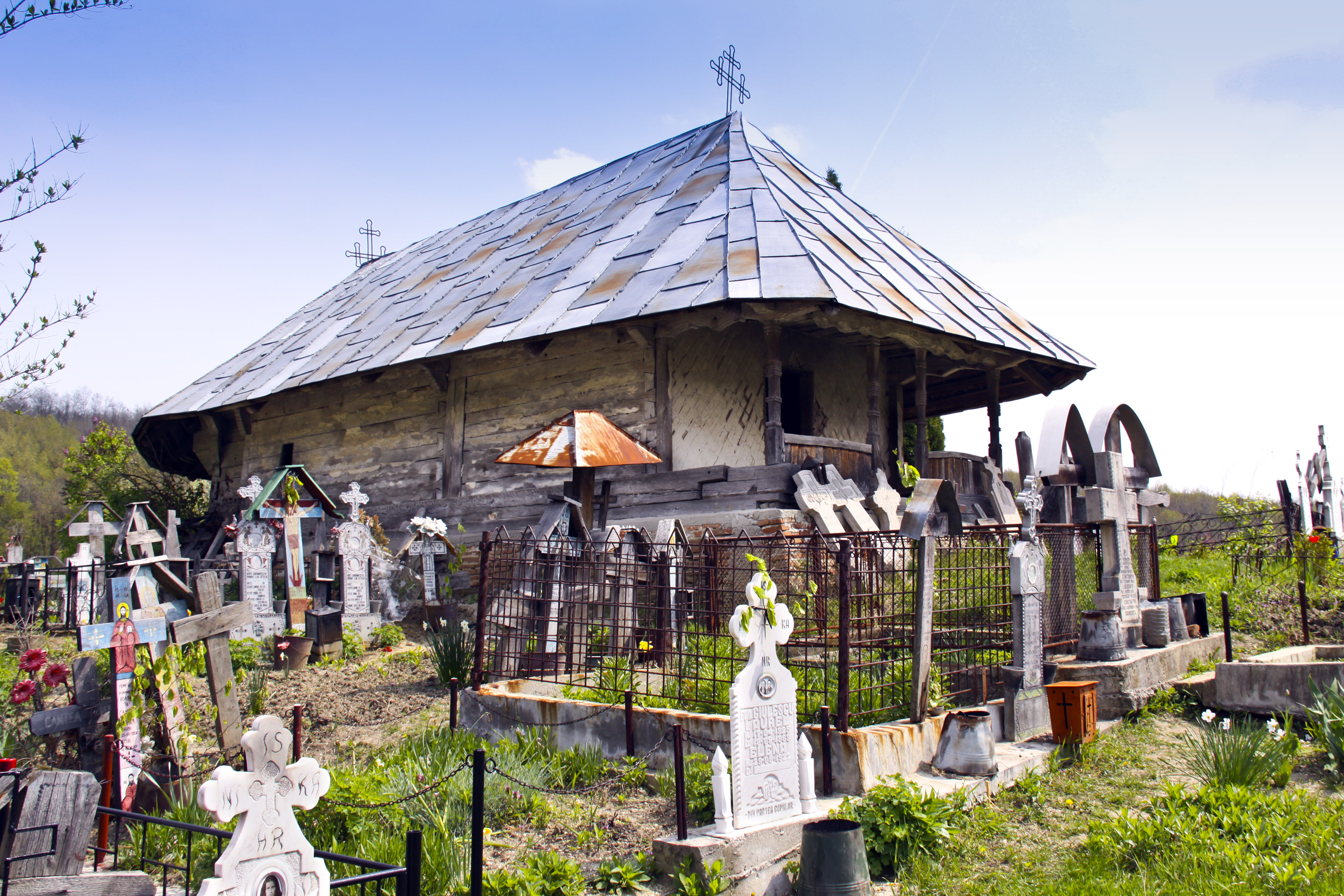
- Wooden church in Amărăști

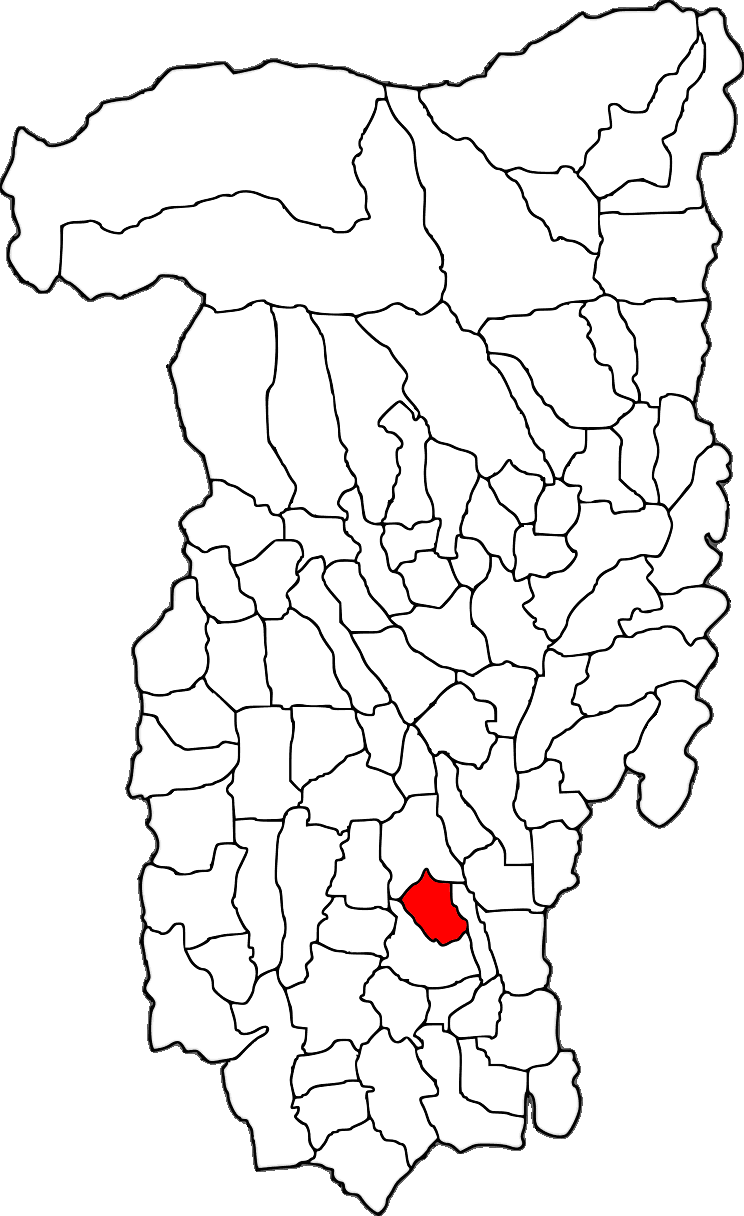
- Location in Vâlcea County

- Location in Romania
- Coordinates: 44°46′N 24°09′E
- Country: Romania
- County: Vâlcea

Government
  - Mayor (2024–2028): Adrian Catana (PNL)
- Area: 27.86 km^{2} (10.76 sq mi)
- Elevation: 222 m (728 ft)
- Population (2021-12-01): 1,530
  - Density: 54.9/km^{2} (142/sq mi)
- Time zone: UTC+02:00 (EET)
  - Summer (DST): UTC+03:00 (EEST)
- Postal code: 247015
- Area code: +(40) 250
- Vehicle reg.: VL
- Website: www.primariaamarasti.ro

Amărăști is a commune located in Vâlcea County, Oltenia, Romania. It is composed of six villages: Amărăști, Mereșești, Nemoiu, Padina, Palanga, and Teiul.

Historical population
Year	Pop.	±%
2002	2,145	—
2011	1,826	−14.9%
2021	1,530	−16.2%
Source: Census data
