= Kresna Municipality =

Coordinates: 41.7355°N 23.1757°E

Kresna Municipality Община Кресна
- Municipality
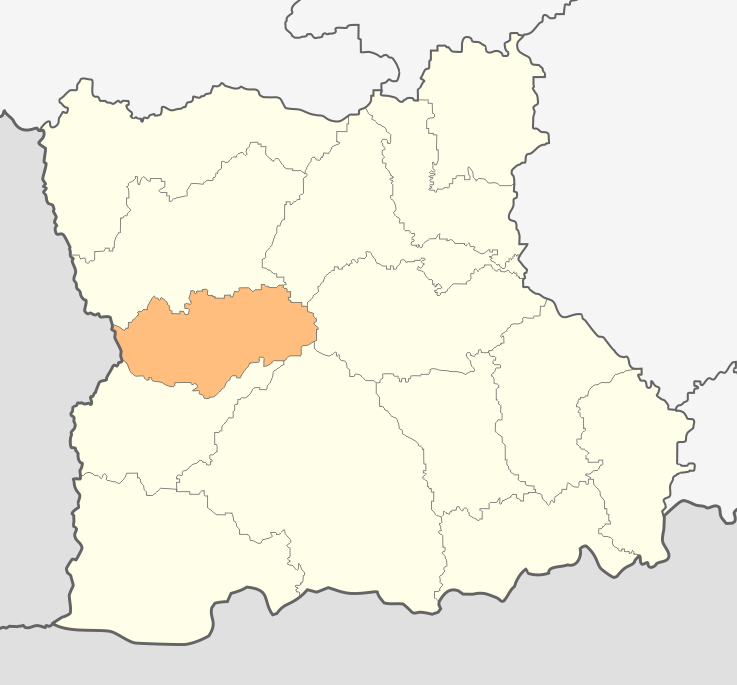
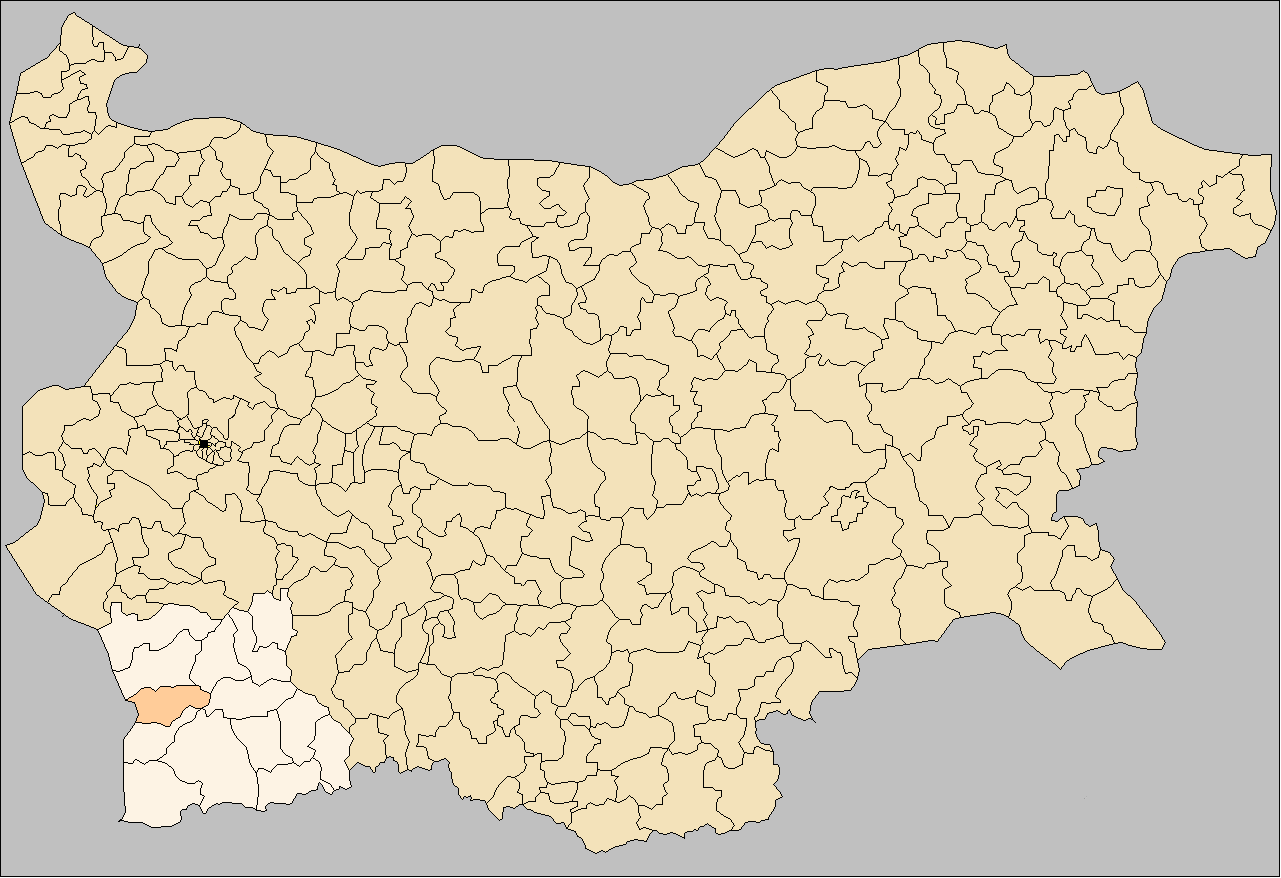
- Location in Blagoevgrad province Location on map of Bulgaria
- Country: Bulgaria
- Province (Oblast): Blagoevgrad

Area
  - Total: 344.55 km^{2} (133.03 sq mi)

Population
  - Total: 5,441
  - Density: 15.79/km^{2} (40.90/sq mi)

Kresna Municipality is a municipality in Blagoevgrad Province in southwestern Bulgaria. The administrative center is the town of Kresna.

== Towns and villages ==
The following towns and villages are located in Kresna Municipality:

- Kresna (Кресна)
- Dolna Gradeshnitsa (Долна Градешница)
- Ezerets (Езерец)
- Gorna Breznitsa (Горна Брезница)
- Oshtava (Ощава)
- Slivnitsa (Сливница)
- Stara Kresna (Стара Кресна)
- Vlahi (Влахи)

== Religion ==
According to the latest Bulgarian census of 2011, the religious composition, among those who answered the optional question on religious identification, was the following:

Religious composition of Kresna Municipality
Orthodox Christianity	97.0%
Catholicism	0.0%
Protestantism	0.2%
Islam	0.1%
No religion	0.7%
Prefer not to answer, others and indefinable	2.0%

== See also ==
- 1904 Kresna earthquakes – Pair of earthquakes that devastated Kresna
