= Kresna Gorge =

Valley in Bulgaria

- Кресненско дефиле
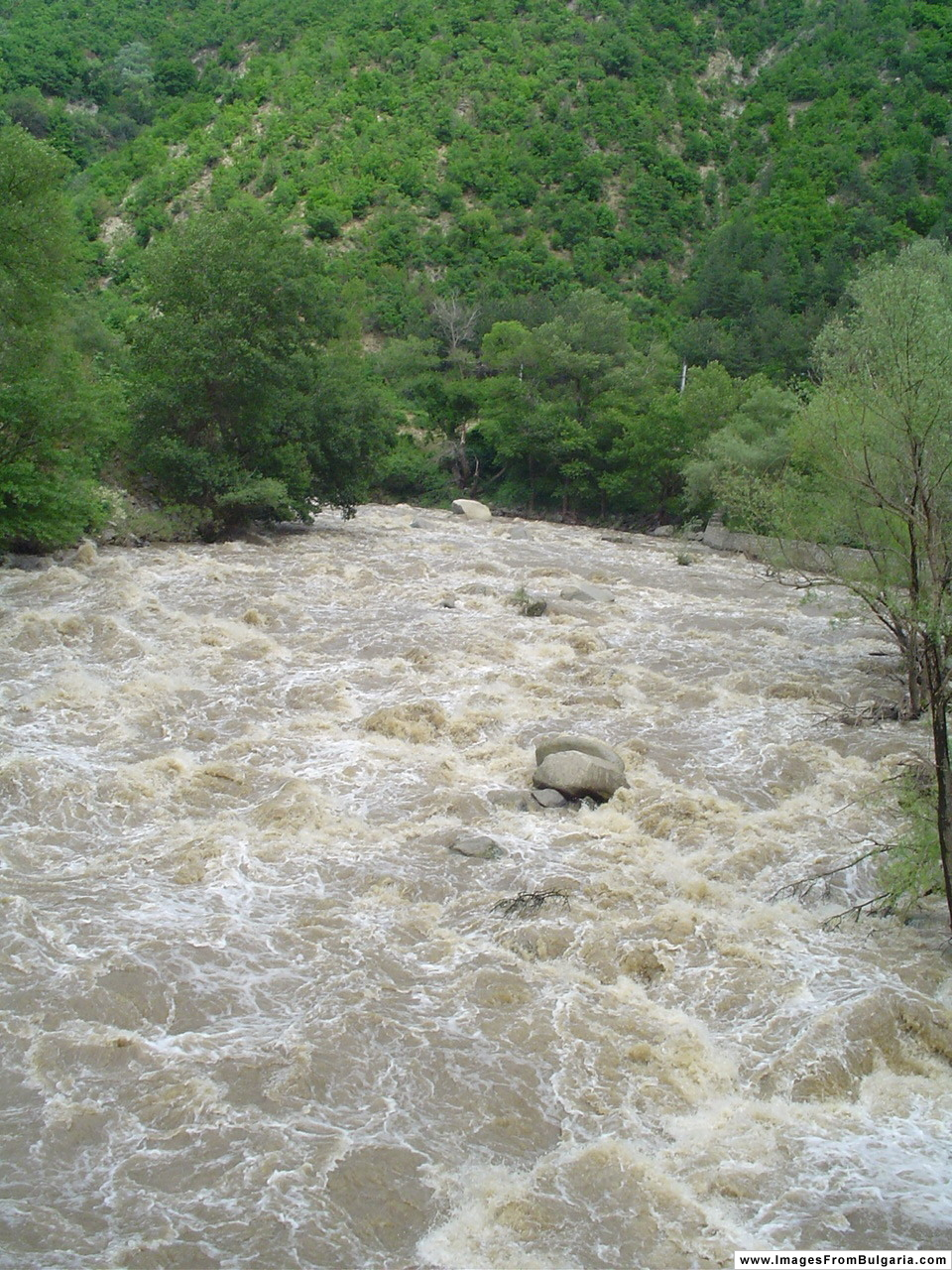
- Struma River in Kresna Gorge

- Location within Bulgaria
- Floor elevation: 222 m (728 ft)
- Length: 18 km (11 mi) north to south

Geology
- Type: Gorge

Geography
- Location: Pirin and Maleshevo mountain ranges, Bulgaria
- Coordinates: 41°46′7″N 23°9′18″E
- Interactive map of Kresna Gorge

Kresna Gorge (Bulgarian: Кресненско дефиле) is a steep valley in south-western Bulgaria, stretching about 18 km (11 mi). The gorge has been formed by the Struma River, which flows from the Vitosha mountains. Kresna gorge has a rich biodiversity, which has come under pressure from the Struma motorway construction project, a new leg of the Trans European Corridor No. 4. In the south, the gorge bisects the Tisata nature reserve.

Kresna Gorge was the place of the Battle of Kresna Gorge between Bulgaria and Greece during the 1913 Second Balkan War. The Greek army was threatened by encirclement in the valley, but due to the Romanian army advancing against the undefended capital Sofia, Bulgaria had to agree to an armistice and the resulting peace treaty in Bucharest which was unfavorable to Bulgaria's territorial aspirations.

== Terrain and Climate ==
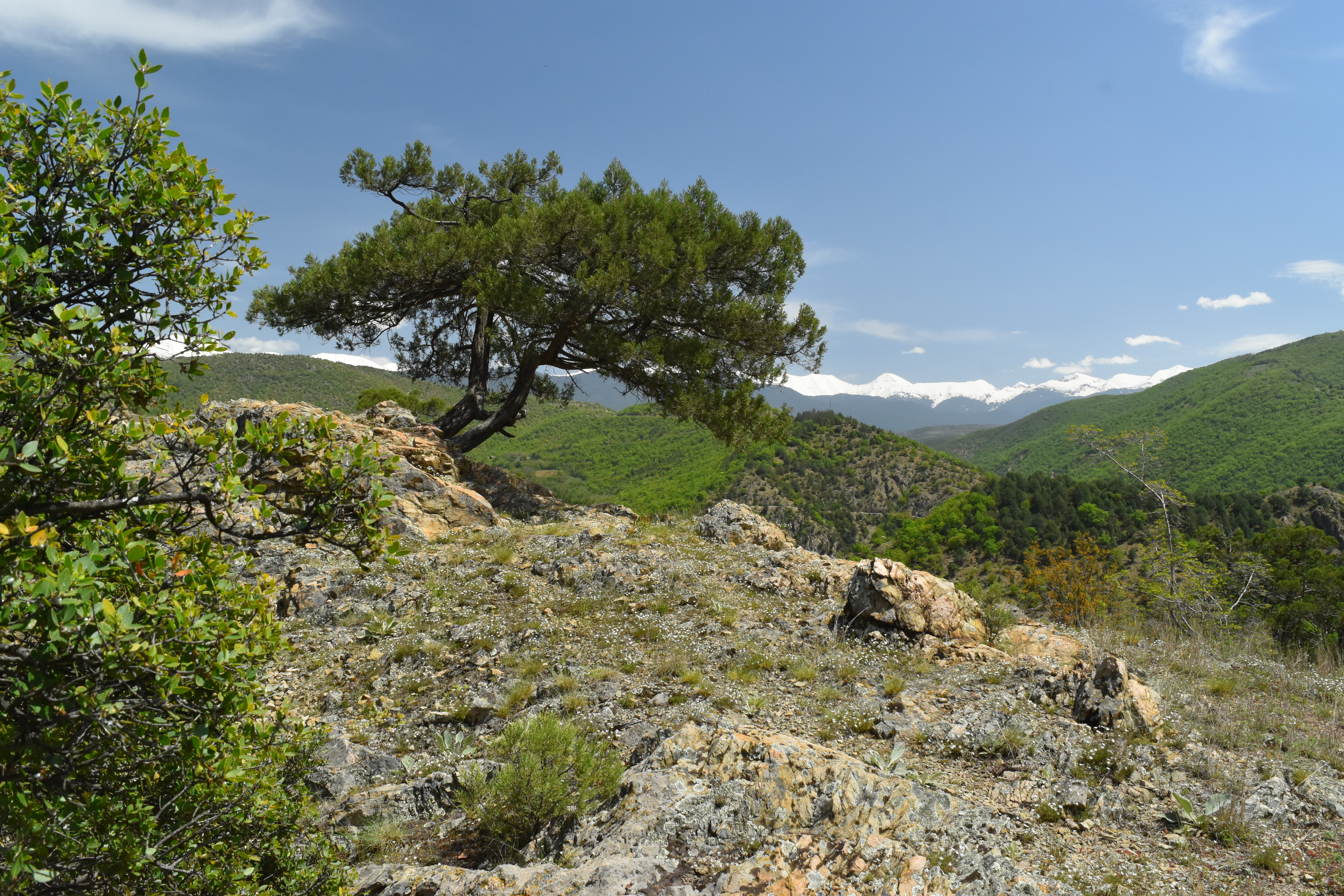
Tisata Reserve protects the Mediterranean evergeen flora of the Kresna Gorge, including Bulgaria's largest habitats of Greek juniper and green olive tree

Kresna Gorge is situated near the villages of Palat, Drakata, and Krupnik while surrounded by the Pirin and Maleshevska Mountains. The gorge is a transitory Mediterranean climate, as it is located between the Central-European and Mediterranean climate zones. The Struma River cuts through the gorge and is a main geological feature. Near the riverbank are sediment soils which transition into shallow alluvial soil with maroon soil on the side. The rocky terrain varies throughout the gorge, including stony slopes, large vertical cliffs, and small rocky sections.

== Ecology ==
Kresna Gorge is home to a diverse fauna and flora, as well as a ranging terrain. The southern reaches of the gorge bisect the Tisata nature reserve in two. The gorge is home to many important Mediterranean plant species, habitats, landscapes, and bird wildlife. There are approximately 31 species of reptiles, 75 species of mammals, and 232 species of birds in this relatively small gorge. Kresna Gorge is considered a Natura 2000 conservation site, signifying its importance in the protection of endangered species. Some species of birds, such as cormorants, may not nest and breed in the gorge, but are utilizing its resources as part of longer passageways and migratory routes. The resources provided by the gorge are crucial, and serve as the main resting sites to threatened and rare species such as the Egyptian vulture.

There are multiple types of forests located inside the gorge, including different types of oak trees such as Quercus pubescens, Carpinus orientalis, and Fraxinus ornus. Considering the climate, typical Mediterranean flora species such as Quercus coccifera and Phillyrea thrive here. The magnitude of the vegetation and plant population in Kresna provides a foundation for the varied populations of birds and other animals who lives here.

== Struma Motorway ==
The Struma motorway, a project that is part of The European Transport Corridor No IV, is planned to cut through the Kresna Gorge. The motorway is seen by the European Union, as well as the Bulgarian government, as a vital trade and tourism route, and receives funding from the European Investment Bank (EIB). The motorway will provide a passageway from Germany and Hungary to Greece, and aims to boost the Bulgarian economy. The project, however, will also have some destructive effects for the inhabitants of the gorge and its ecosystem. With the current road in the gorge, lack of proper mitigation has already led to many road kills over the years; with the construction of the new motorway project, animal mortality rate is expected to increase, not just because of direct traffic accidents but also because of the effects of deforestation and habitat loss.

The locals in the nearby villages are afraid their shops and livelihoods will be deserted when the motorway opens. They also fear that Kresna will attract fewer tourists and that young residents will migrate to other countries. The motorway will force some of the villagers to lose land and property during the construction, negatively impacting their livelihoods.

The European Union financed both the Bulgarian government to build the motorway and the environmental groups that defend the endangered nature through construction. There has been a long battle between the government and construction companies on the one hand and residents and environmental groups on the other.

In June 2025 it was reported that the highway will not pass through the Kresna Gorge, and alternative routes will be sought.
