= Kresna =

Kresna Кресна
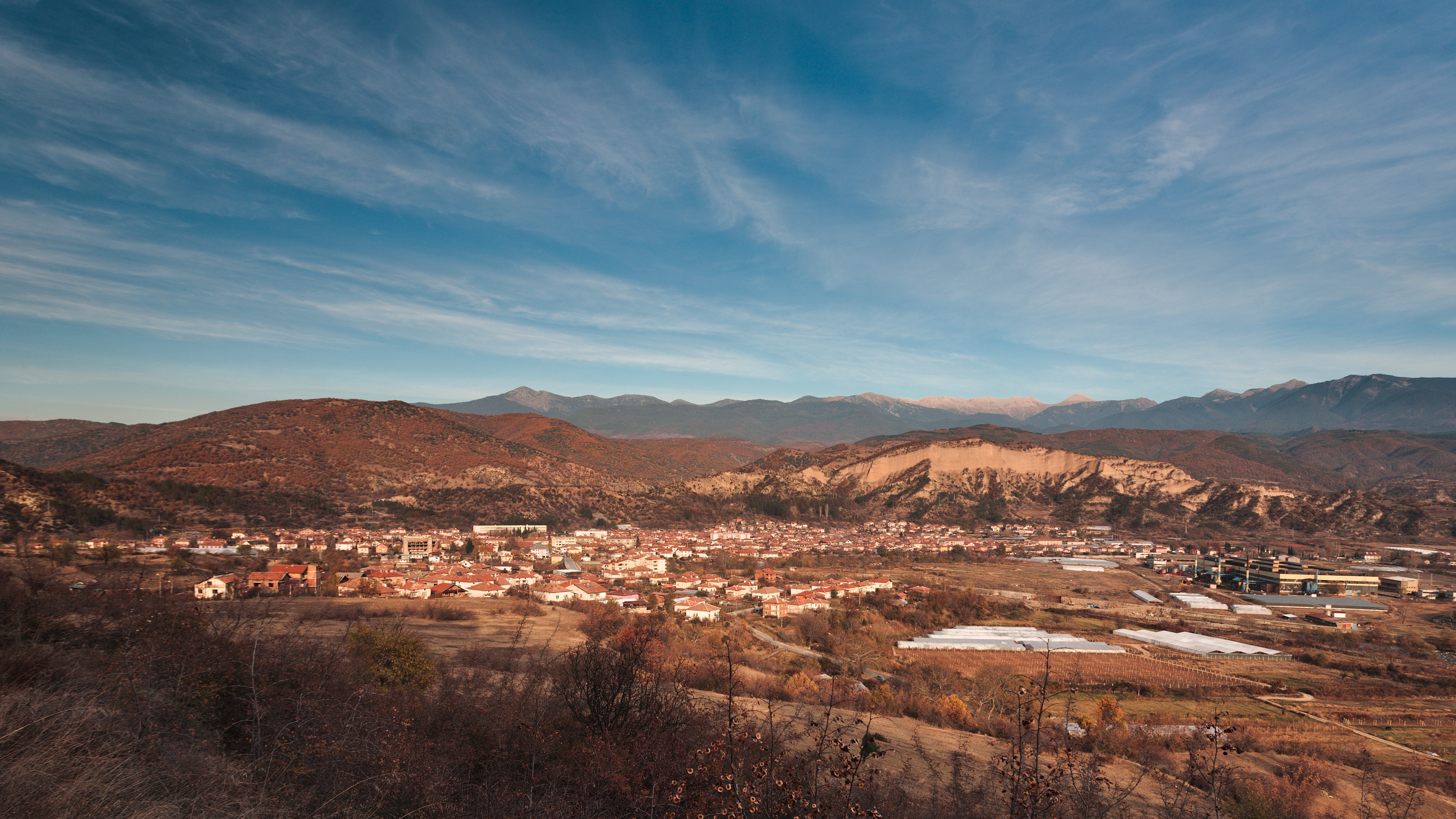

- Location of Kresna
- Coordinates: 41°44′N 23°9′E
- Country: Bulgaria
- Provinces (Oblast): Blagoevgrad

Government
  - Mayor: Nikolay Georgiev
- Elevation: 232 m (761 ft)

Population
  - Total: 3,987
- Time zone: UTC+2 (EET)
  - Summer (DST): UTC+3 (EEST)
- Postal Code: 2940
- Area code: 07433

Kresna (Bulgarian: Кресна [ˈkrɛsnɐ]) is a town and the seat of Kresna Municipality in Blagoevgrad Province in Bulgaria.

It is located in the southwestern part of Bulgaria.

== History ==
Archaeological findings indicate that the area has been inhabited since antiquity.

The Kresna–Razlog uprising began on October 5, 1878, in opposition to Ottoman rule in the region following the Congress of Berlin. The uprising spread to the Razlog area but was suppressed in 1879.

The Kultura Community Center was established in 1932 in Kriva Livada, a settlement that later became part of Kresna.

The settlement was formerly known as Gara Pirin (Pirin Station). Under Decree No. 1582 of September 6, 1978, it was granted town status and renamed Kresna. The decree was published in the State Gazette on September 29, 1978. At the same time, the former village of Kresna was renamed Stara Kresna.

== Geography ==
The municipality of Kresna (7,560 inhabitants) covers parts of the valley of the Struma River with the picturesque Kresna gorge, the western branches of Pirin and the northeastern slopes of the Maleshev mountain. The area is attractive with its uniqueness and natural beauty.

The town of Kresna (4,600 inhabitants) is located on both sides of the international road E-79. Before the city, at a picturesque bend of the Struma river, there is a monument to those who died in the Kresnensko-Razlozhko Uprising (1878). Passers-by are impressed by the temple-monument "St. Ivan Rilski" (on the right of the road), the pleasant center and the Melo sand screes, which rise like a giant fan in the east-northeast, and in the background - the majestic ridge of Pirin

In Pirin is located the resort area of Sinanitsa (Blue Peak), through which a hiking route to the hut and lake of the same name passes. The village of Vlahi is known for its nature. Near Vlahi, in the village of Oshtava and in the area of Gradeshka Banya, there are mineral springs. In the Maleshevska Planina, along the valley of the Breznishka River, are ancient plane trees. On the hill above the village of Breznitsa, on the site of an old monastery, the "Holy Prophet Elijah" monastery was built.

The remains of the ancient city of Neine (near the village of Dolna Gradeshnitsa) and of the medieval monastery "St. St. Cosmas and Damian" (near the village of Vlahi) speak of the centuries-old history of the area. In each of the settlements in the municipality there are interesting churches to visit. The oldest, "Nativity of the Virgin", is in the village of Vlahi and dates back to 1750.

On both sides of the Struma is the "Tisata" reserve - the largest juniper forest on the Balkan Peninsula, which is home to over a hundred species of birds. Its also home to 11 out of 16 native snake species.

== Religion ==
The population professes Eastern Orthodoxy. In 1941, the church "St. Ivan Rilski" was built in Kresna.

== Transportation ==
Kresna lies on the route E79, which leads from Sofia to the Greek border.

== Namesakes ==
Kresna Gully on Livingston Island in the South Shetland Islands, Antarctica is named after Kresna.
