= Kosovo (disambiguation) =

Kosovo, officially the Republic of Kosovo, is a country in Southeast Europe with partial diplomatic recognition.

Kosovo may also refer to:

== Places ==
=== Entities on the same territory ===
- Ottoman Kosovo, period of Kosovan history 1455–1913
- Kosovo vilayet, an administrative division of the Ottoman Empire 1877–1913
- Kosovo and Metohija, an autonomous province that Serbia claims under its sovereignty, and the name of autonomous entitites 1945–1968
- SAP Kosovo, an autonomous province in the Socialist Republic of Serbia 1968–1990
- Kosovo District, an administrative district claimed by Serbia in central Kosovo

=== Bulgaria ===
- Kosovo, Kyustendil Province
- Kosovo, Plovdiv Province
- Kosovo, Shumen Province
- Kosovo, Vidin Province
- Gorsko Kosovo, a village in Suhindol Municipality, Veliko Tarnovo Province
- Polsko Kosovo, a village in Byala Municipality, Ruse Province

=== North Macedonia ===
- Kosovo, Makedonski Brod, a village in the municipality of Makedonski Brod
- Kosovo Dabje, a village in the municipality of Delčevo

=== Russia ===
- Kosovo, Dzerzhinsky District, Kaluga Oblast, a village in Dzerzhinsky District of Kaluga Oblast
- Kosovo, Medynsky District, Kaluga Oblast, a village in Medynsky District of Kaluga Oblast
- Kosovo, Klinsky District, Moscow Oblast, a village under the administrative jurisdiction of the Town of Vysokovsk in Klinsky District of Moscow Oblast; 56°19′N 36°34′E
- Kosovo, Shakhovskoy District, Moscow Oblast, a village in Seredinskoye Rural Settlement of Shakhovskoy District in Moscow Oblast; 55°45′N 35°27′E
- Kosovo, Novgorod Oblast, a village in Batetskoye Settlement of Batetsky District in Novgorod Oblast
- Kosovo, Pskov Oblast, a village in Velikoluksky District of Pskov Oblast
- Kosovo, Tver Oblast, a village in Akhmatovskoye Rural Settlement of Molokovsky District in Tver Oblast
- Kosovo, Vologda Oblast, a village in Nozemsky Selsoviet of Mezhdurechensky District in Vologda Oblast
- Kosovo, Yaroslavl Oblast, a village in Maryinsky Rural Okrug of Danilovsky District in Yaroslavl Oblast

== Other uses ==
- "Kosovo" (song), a song criticizing US involvement in the Kosovo War
- Malo Kosovo
- North Kosovo

== See also ==
- Kosova (disambiguation)
- Kosovo Polje (disambiguation)
- Kosowo (disambiguation)
- Kosava (disambiguation)
- Kosów (disambiguation)
- Metohija (disambiguation)
- Kosovo and Metohija (disambiguation)
- Names of Kosovo
