= List of rural localities in Novgorod Oblast =

Map of Russia with Novgorod Oblast highlighted

This is a list of rural localities in Novgorod Oblast. Novgorod Oblast (Russian: Новгоро́дская о́бласть, Novgorodskaya oblast) is a federal subject of Russia (an oblast). Its administrative center is the city of Veliky Novgorod. Some of the oldest Russian cities, including Veliky Novgorod and Staraya Russa, are located in the oblast. The historic monuments of Veliky Novgorod and surroundings have been declared a UNESCO World Heritage Site. Population: 634,111 (2010 Census).

== Locations ==
- Abramkovo
- Abrosovo
- Batetsky
- Bolshaya Vishera
- Dolgiye Borody
- Dubishki
- Kosovo
- Maryovo
- Moshenskoye
- Poddorye
- Semytino
- Star
- Terebutenets
- Volot
- Yazhelbitsy

== See also ==
- Lists of rural localities in Russia
