= Abrosovo =

Abrosovo (Russian: Абросово) is the name of several rural localities in Russia:

- Abrosovo, Ivanovo Oblast, a village in Verkhnelandekhovsky District of Ivanovo Oblast
- Abrosovo, Novgorod Oblast, a village in Pestovsky District of Novgorod Oblast
- Abrosovo, Pskov Oblast, a village in Pskovsky District of Pskov Oblast
- Abrosovo, Vladimir Oblast, a village in Petushinsky District of Vladimir Oblast
