= Kosovo, Russia =

Kosovo (Russian: Косово) is the name of several rural localities in Russia:

- Kosovo, Dzerzhinsky District, Kaluga Oblast, a village in Dzerzhinsky District of Kaluga Oblast
- Kosovo, Medynsky District, Kaluga Oblast, a village in Medynsky District of Kaluga Oblast
- Kosovo, Klinsky District, Moscow Oblast, a village under the administrative jurisdiction of the Town of Vysokovsk in Klinsky District of Moscow Oblast; 56°19′N 36°34′E
- Kosovo, Shakhovskoy District, Moscow Oblast, a village in Seredinskoye Rural Settlement of Shakhovskoy District in Moscow Oblast; 55°45′N 35°27′E
- Kosovo, Novgorod Oblast, a village in Batetskoye Settlement of Batetsky District in Novgorod Oblast
- Kosovo, Pskov Oblast, a village in Velikoluksky District of Pskov Oblast
- Kosovo, Tver Oblast, a village in Akhmatovskoye Rural Settlement of Molokovsky District in Tver Oblast
- Kosovo, Vologda Oblast, a village in Nozemsky Selsoviet of Mezhdurechensky District in Vologda Oblast
- Kosovo, Yaroslavl Oblast, a village in Maryinsky Rural Okrug of Danilovsky District in Yaroslavl Oblast
