= Dolgiye Borody =

Dolgiye Borody may refer to:

- Dolgiye Borody (residence)
- Dolgiye Borody (rural locality)
