= Batetsky =

Batetsky (masculine), Batetskaya (feminine), or Batetskoye (neuter) may refer to:

- Batetsky District, a district of Novgorod Oblast, Russia
- Batetsky (rural locality), a rural locality (a settlement) in Novgorod Oblast, Russia
