= Delčevo =

Town in the municipality of Delčevo, North Macedonia

Delčevo Делчево (Macedonian)
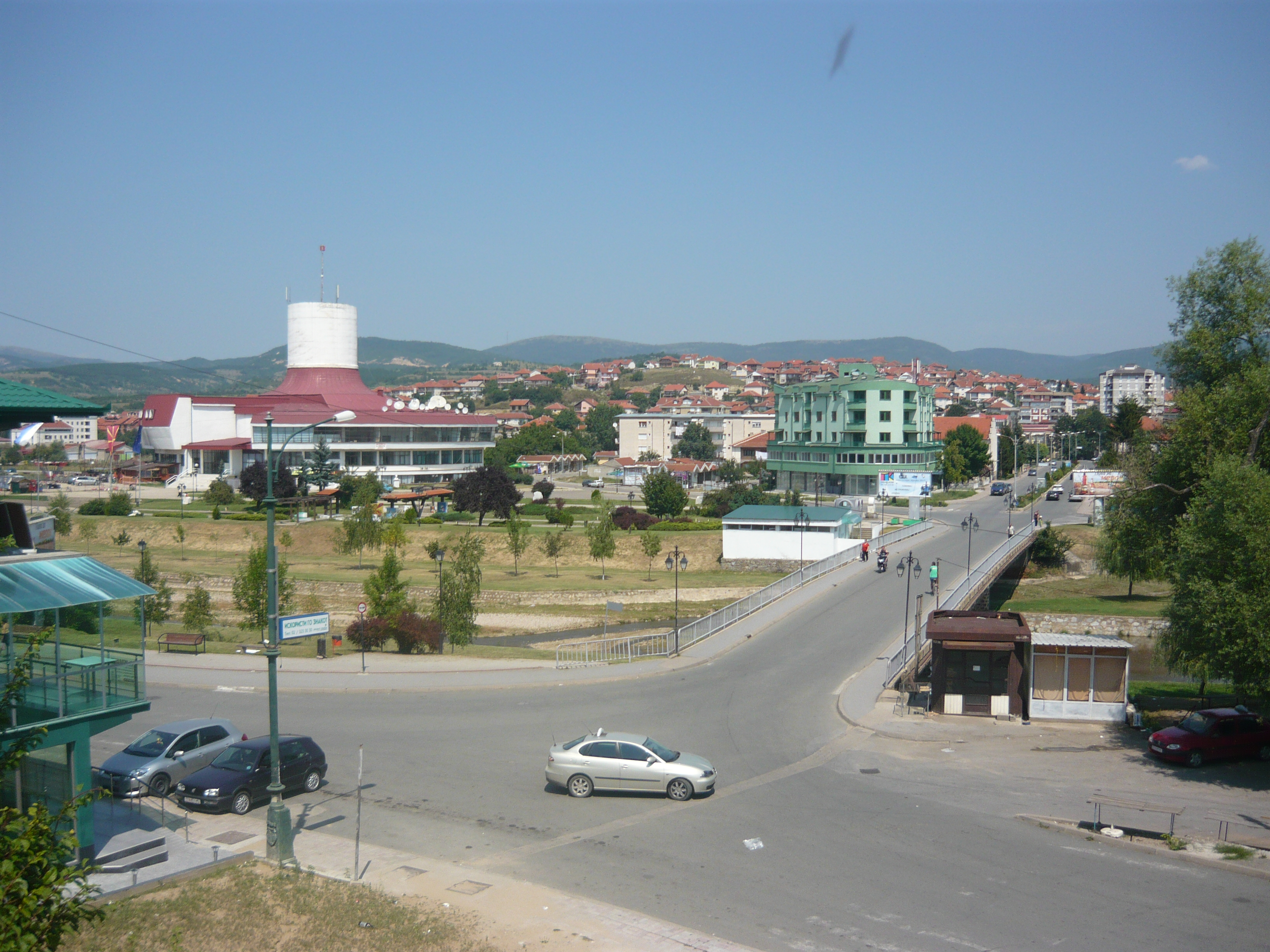
- Town centre of Delčevo

- Flag Seal

- Location within North Macedonia
- Coordinates: 41°58′N 22°46′E
- Country: North Macedonia
- Region: Eastern
- Municipality: Delčevo

Government
  - Mayor: Ivan Gocevski (VMRO-DPMNE)
- Highest elevation: 640 m (2,100 ft)
- Lowest elevation: 590 m (1,940 ft)

Population (2021)
  - Total: 13,585
- Time zone: UTC+1 (CET)
  - Summer (DST): UTC+2 (CEST)
- Postal code: 2320
- Area code: +389 033
- Vehicle registration: DE
- Climate: Cfb
- Website: www.delcevo.gov.mk/

Delčevo (Macedonian: Делчево [ˈdɛɫtʃɛvɔ]) is a small town in the eastern mountainous part of North Macedonia. It is the municipal seat of Delčevo Municipality. The town is named after the revolutionary leader Goce Delčev.

== History ==
Delčevo, according to a legend in Byzantine times, was called Vasilevo, as a Greek variant of the Slavonic Tsarevo. For the first time, Tsarevo Selo is mentioned as a settlement in a charter of Serbian Tsar Dushan from 1347 to 1350. With it he gave several places and fields from Pijanec to the Lesnovo Monastery.

=== Ottoman period ===
In Turkish times, Delčevo was also called Sultania, by analogy with the original name.

Until the 17th century, the settlement laid on the right side of the river Bregalnica on the present toponym Selishte, more precisely under the hill Ostrec near the road leading to Bulgaria. From the first centuries of Turkish rule there is not much information about the position of Delčevo. In the middle of the 17th century, Sultan Mehmed IV lived in its vicinity. At the time of his visit to Pijanec, mass Islamization was carried out on the population. Due to the oppression and pressure, many Bulgarian settlements were deserted, including the then Tsarevo Selo. It is assumed that at the time of that sultan the settlement was moved to its present place on the left side of the river Bregalnica. The city mosque built in the 17th century is also cited as evidence.

However, it is thought-provoking that the Turkish travel writer Evliya Çelebi spent here only a few years later in 1670 and wrote in his Travelogue:

"From Vinica we climbed the Kocani mountain ore, moving through the gorge and after four hours we reached Tsarevo Selo. This is a Muslim village at the foot of a mountain and is decorated with about 100 houses and a magnificent mosque mined by a minaret."

We should also mention the folk tradition that says that the settlement under the Ostrec hill was deserted when the plague reigned and the surviving population settled on the place where Delčevo is today.

In 1856, the construction of a church was completed. The area around the church was at this time mainly inhabited by Bulgarians fleeing Turkish oppression from the surrounding villages. There was a larger emigration of Bulgarians from the area in 1878 after the Russo-Turkish war. After the end of the war the Christian population, fearing for their safety, fled the region seeking refuge on the territory of the newly created Bulgaria. About 150 households from the villages and the city moved to the Kyustendil region. A small number of those refugees later returned. Turkish refugees from Bulgaria and even Bosnia and Herzegovina settled in the place of the emigrated Bulgarians. The invading Turkish population, called "Madzirci" settled in Madzir maalo (Madzir Neighbourhood), today's III district of the city.

On the left side by the river Bregalnica, on the narrow flat space where the bazzar and inns were, the construction of the trade and craft shops along the two narrow streets started. With that, the bazaar was finally formed and Delčevo grew into a city settlement.

=== Balkan and World Wars ===
During the Balkan Wars, a large number of Turks left the city, so that in 1914 the population was 1.701. After these wars, Bulgarian settlers came from the surrounding villages, mostly from the passive villages of Bigla, Selnik and Dramče, which bought Turkish properties.

In 1931 the population increased to 3.746 inhabitants. After this year, the emigration of the Turkish population to Turkey continued voluntarily, especially in 1953. In 1935, the construction of the first houses on the right side of the river Bregalnica began.

After the liberation, on April 23, 1950, the Presidium of the National Assembly of the People's Republic of Macedonia decided that Tsarevo Selo should be renamed Delčevo, in honor of Goce Delčev.

In the sixties the town expanded on the right side of the river Bregalnica, and in the seventies on the hill Milkovo Brdo (Milkov's hill). With the increase of the employees in the working organizations in Delčevo, the number of the population in it also grew. Today Delčevo is a modern urban settlement with wide asphalt streets and boulevards, sewerage network and parks and greenery.

== Location ==
Delčevo is located 164 km (102 mi) east of Skopje, along the river Bregalnica at the foot of Mount Golak. It is the largest settlement in the Pijanec area, which stretches over an area of 585 km^{2} (226 sq mi), located between the Osogovo Mountains (north) and Maleševo (south). The city lies at an altitude of 590 m (1,940 ft) to 640 m (2,100 ft). Despite being located in the easternmost part of the country, Delčevo has a relatively good geographical position and traffic connection. It is a crossroads for eastern Macedonia. Through Pehčevo (27 km (17 mi)) and Berovo (34 km (21 mi)) it is connected with Strumica to the south, and through Makedonska Kamenica (24 km (15 mi)) and Kočani (51 km (32 mi)) it is connected with Štip to the northwest. To the west is Vinica (39 km (24 mi)), and to the east is the border crossing with Bulgaria, called "Arnautski Grob" (Arnaut's grave) (11 km (6.8 mi)), through which the capital of Pirin Macedonia - Gorna Dzumaja (Blagoevgrad) (34 km (21 mi)) can be reached.

== Climate ==
The climate in Delčevo is continental Eastern European. The average annual temperature in Delčevo is 11 °C (52 °F), with an absolute minimum of -26 °C (-15 °F) and an absolute maximum of 39 °C (102 °F), while in higher areas the average annual temperature drops to 3.5 °C (38 °F). The warmest month is August, and the coldest is January. Spring is always colder than autumn.

The cloudiness isn't strong, so the year is dominated by sunny and clear days. The average annual rainfall in Delčevo is 548 mm (22 in), and in the mountains over 1.600 meters (5,250 ft) above sea level. and up to 1.000 mm (39 in). Precipitation, although relatively low, their distribution in the vegetation period (April–September) is favorable and is over 50% of the total annual precipitation.

The vegetation period with a temperature higher than 10 °C (50 °F) lasts 191 days during the year. This favorable climate allows the growth of various plants, and is also a very suitable natural condition for the development of tourism in this area.

== Demographics ==
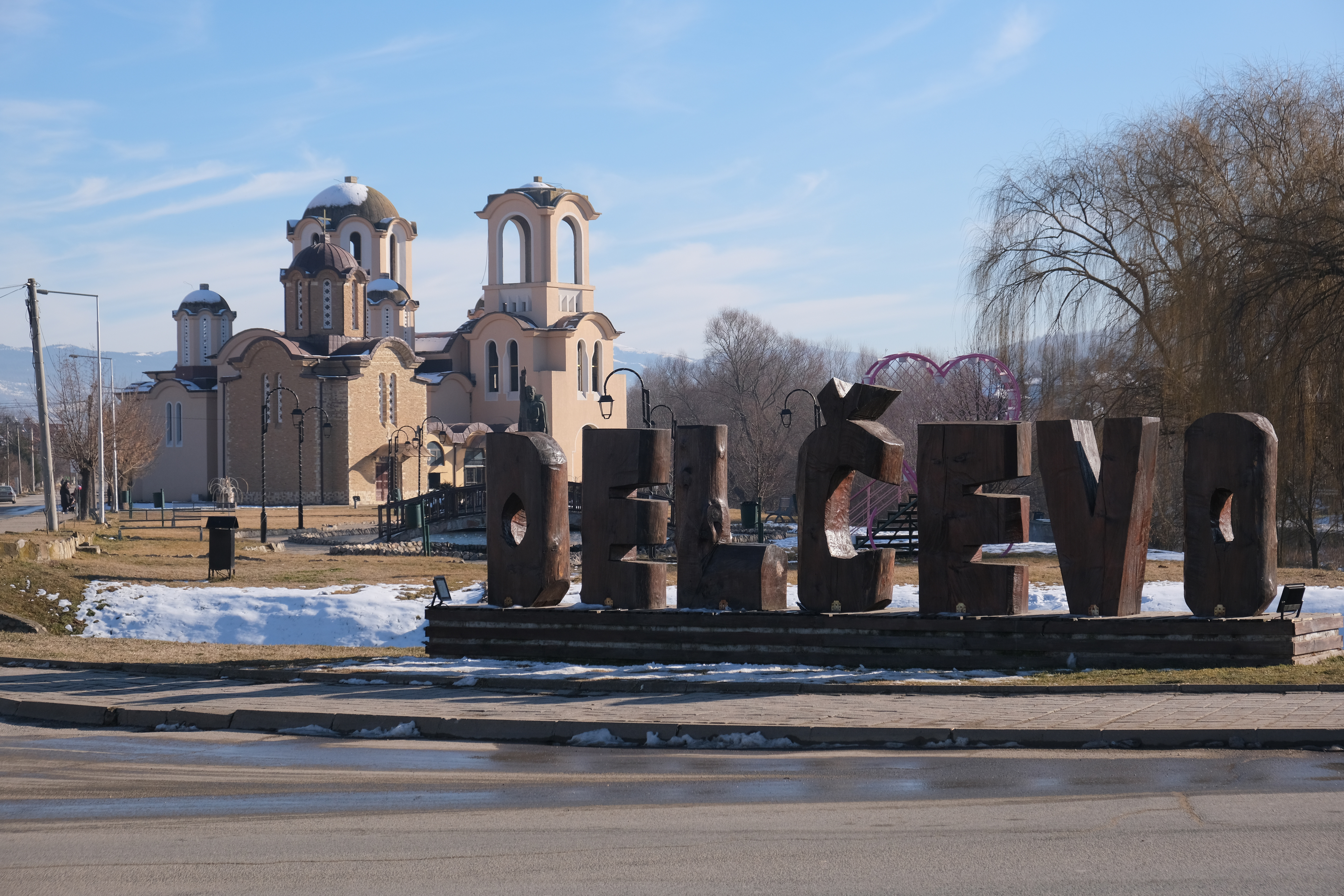
St. Naum of Ohrid church in Delčevo.

According to the statistics of Vasil Kanchov ("Macedonia, Ethnography and Statistics",1900), there were 1.520 inhabitants in Tsarevo Selo (Delčevo), of which 575 Bulgarians were Muslims, 520 Bulgarians were Christians and 425 were Turks.

In the first organized census of SFR Yugoslavia from 1948, there were 20.159 inhabitants in the Tsarevo Selo area, of which 3,173 in Tsarevo Selo (Delčevo) and 16.986 in the villages (Pijanec, Osogovo). From an ethnic point of view, the population consisted of 15.669 (77.7%) Macedonians, 4,036 (20%) Turks, but some of them were Macedonian Muslims, 300 (1.48%) Roma and 154 others.

According to the 2002 census, the city had a population of 11.500 and belonged to the group of medium-sized towns.

The main ethnic group is Macedonian. Romani people are the biggest minority.

Ethnicities
Year	Macedonians	Roma	Turks	Serbs	Albanians	Aromanians	Other	Total
1948	N/A	N/A	N/A	N/A	N/A	N/A	N/A	3.173
1953	1.596	178	1.127	90	2	0	40	3.033
1961	2.645	N/A	318	56	0	N/A	128	3.147
1971	4.464	172	353	51	11	N/A	53	5.104
1981	7.349	450	170	32	7	0	57	8.065
1991	9.832	551	161	29	8	0	83	10.664
1994	9.845	521	121	29	9	0	29	10.554
2002	10.761	564	97	25	7	3	43	11.500
2021	11,949	475	112	9	20	5	108	13,585

The official language of the municipality is Macedonian.

Languages
Language	Number	Percentage
Macedonian	10.851	94,36
Romani	402	3,50
Turkish	188	1,63
Serbian	26	0,23
Albanian	7	0,06
Bosniak	2	0,02
Aromanian	1	0,01
Other	25	0,22

Delčevo is a secular town. The main religion is Orthodox Christianity. Islam is mostly practiced by the Roma and Turkish minority. The town has many churches and a mosque for its citizens.

Religions
Religion	Number	Percentage
Orthodox Christian	10.594	92,12
Islam	660	5,74
Protestantism	4	0.03
Catholicism	3	0,03
Other/Atheism	239	2,08

== Sport and culture ==
The football club FK Bregalnica Delčevo play their home games at the City Stadion "Goce Delčev", which has a capacity of 5,000 people. A festival in celebration of the Macedonian Bulgarian revolutionary leader Goce Delčev is held every year on August 2. The ruins of the (Byzantine) village of Vasilevo lie about 3 km (1,9 mi) southeast of the town, and the Monastery of Sveta Bogoridica (St. Mother of Christ), noted for its bright frescoes, is situated about 3 km (1,9 mi) to the southwest.

== Cultural and social facilities ==
=== Churches ===
- Church "Assumption of the Most Holy Mother of God" - a church in the higher part of the city;
- Church "St. Cyril and Methodius" - a new church in the lower part of the city;
- Church "St. Kliment Ohridski" - a new church on the location where in 1961, by a decision of the then government, a church was demolished;
- Church "St. Naum Ohridski" - baptistery church. Consecrated on August 4, 2013.
- Church "St. Bogorodica" - grave church;
- Church "St. Bogorodica Balaklija" - the main monastery church of the Delčevo Monastery;
- Church "Protection of the Most Holy Mother of God" - a monastery church in the Delčevo Monastery;

=== Schools ===
- Secondary school "Metodija Mitevski Brico" - Delčevo
- Primary school "Vančo Prke" - Delčevo
- Primary school "St. Kliment Ohridski" - Delčevo

== Twin towns — sister cities ==
Delčevo is twinned with:

- Blagoevgrad, Bulgaria
- Bornova, Turkey
- Goražde, Bosnia and Herzegovina
- Jagodina, Serbia
- Mladost (Varna), Bulgaria
- Simitli, Bulgaria
- Vyshhorod, Ukraine
- Żyrardów, Poland
- Vălenii de Munte, Romania
- Felsőzsolca, Hungary
