= Kopačka =

Kopačka may refer to:

- Kopačka (region), a region in Kičevo Municipality, North Macedonia
- Kopačka (folk dance), a Macedonian oro, folk dance, from North Macedonia
- Kopačka (folklore ensemble), a folklore musical ensemble from the North Macedonia
