= Delčevo Municipality =

Municipality of North Macedonia

Coordinates: 41.9764°N 22.7674°E

Delčevo Municipality Општина Делчево
- Urban municipality
- Flag Coat of arms

- Location within North Macedonia
- Country: North Macedonia
- Region: Eastern
- Municipal seat: Delčevo

Government
  - Mayor: Ivan Gocevski (VMRO-DPMNE)

Area
  - Total: 422 km^{2} (163 sq mi)

Population
  - Total: 13,585
  - Density: 32.2/km^{2} (83.4/sq mi)
- Time zone: UTC+1 (CET)
- Postal code: 2320
- Area code: 033
- Vehicle registration: DE
- Website: http://www.delcevo.gov.mk

Delčevo Municipality (Macedonian: Делчево [ˈdɛɫtʃɛvɔ]) is a municipality in Eastern Statistical Region of North Macedonia. The center of the municipality is the city of Delčevo. The geographical area is 423 km^{2} (163 mi^{2}) and has about 13,585 inhabitants. There are 22 settlements in Delčevo: the town of Delčevo, and the villages of Bigla, Vetren, Virce, Vratislavci, Gabrovo, Grad, Dramche, Zvegor, Iliovo, Kiselica, Kosovo Dabje, Nov Istevnik, Ochipala, Razlovci, Selnik, Stamer, Star Istevnik, Trabotivishte, Turija, Poleto and Chiflik. In the past, the municipality was also known as Carevo Selo.

== Demographics ==
According to the 2021 North Macedonia census, there are 13,585 inhabitants.

Genders (2021)
Gender	Number	Percentage
Male	6,806	50.10
Female	6,779	49.90

Ethnicity

	2002		2021	
	Number	%	Number	%
TOTAL	17,505	100	13,585	100
Macedonians	16,637	95.04	11,949	87.96
Roma	651	3.72	475	3.5
Turks	122	0.7	112	0.82
Albanians	7	0.04	20	0.15
Serbs	35	0.2	9	0.07
Vlachs	4	0.02	5	0.04
Bosniaks			2	0.01
Other / Undeclared / Unknown	49	0.28	108	0.79
Persons for whom data are taken from administrative sources			905	6.66

Language

	2002		2021	
	Number	%	Number	%
TOTAL	17,505	100	13,585	100
Macedonian	16,744	95.65	12,257	90.22
Romani	474	2.71	260	1.91
Turkish	201	1.15	100	0.74
Albanian	7	0.04	23	0.17
Serbian	42	0.23	9	0.07
Bosnian			1	0.01
Vlach	1	0.01		
Others	36	0.21	30	0.22
Persons for whom data are taken from administrative sources			905	6.66

Religion

	2002		2021	
	Number	%	Number	%
TOTAL	17,505	100	13,585	100
Christian			6,253	46.02
Orthodox	15,948	91.11	5,709	42.02
Muslims	773	4.42	694	5.11
Catholics	3	0.01	4	0.03
Evangelicals			1	0.01
Protestants	4	0.02		
Other	777	4.44	2	0.01
Atheist			11	0.08
Undeclared			3	0.02
Unknown			3	0.02
Persons for whom data are taken from administrative sources			905	6.66

=== Population and settlements in the municipality of Delčevo ===
Until 1996, the Municipality of Delčevo was one of the 34 municipalities of the Republic of Macedonia. In 1990 the municipality had 26.315 inhabitants or 1.2% of the population of the Republic of Macedonia. The population in that period was divided into 30 settlements, including the city settlement Delčevo. 34% of the population of the municipality were concentrated in the town, and the rest was distributed in rural settlements and in a settlement of mixed type (Makedonska Kamenica). With the new territorial division of the Republic of Macedonia, which formed 123 municipalities, the Municipality of Makedonska Kamenica was separated from the Municipality of Delčevo, so that today it covers a territory of 423 km^{2} (163 mi^{2}) with two-thirds of the population of the old Municipality. In addition to the municipal center Delčevo, there are 22 rural settlements in the municipality.

According to the new territorial division, and in accordance with the data from the last census in 1994, the total population in the Municipality of Delčevo was 17,726 inhabitants, of which 10,554 are inhabitants of the town, and 7,172 inhabitants in rural areas. From the rural settlements in the Municipality of Delčevo, 5 villages had less than 100 inhabitants (Vratislavci, Kiselica, Kosovo Dabje, Selnik and Chiflik), 7 villages have 100 to 300 inhabitants (Vetren, Iliovo, Nov Istevnik, Ochipala, Star Istevnik, Turija and Poleto), in 3 villages were registered between 300 and 500 inhabitants (Bigla, Dramche and Stamer), while 6 villages had over 500 inhabitants (Grad, Virce, Trabotivishte, Gabrovo, Zvegor and Razlovci). The largest rural settlement is Zvegor with 949 inhabitants, followed by Razlovci with 907 inhabitants, Gabrovo with 829 inhabitants, Grad with 696 inhabitants, etc. The birth rate in the Municipality of Delčevo in 1998 was 10.7 live births per 1,000 inhabitants and is slightly lower than the average in the Republic of Macedonia which was 14.6 live births per 1,000 inhabitants. The mortality rate in the municipality in 1998 was 9.9 deaths per 1,000 inhabitants and is slightly higher than the average in the Republic of Macedonia, which was 8.4. According to the 1994 census, there were 2,977 households in the city or 57.3%, and in rural areas 2,216 households or 42.7% of the total number of households in the municipality. There were 3,143 agricultural holdings in the municipality, of which 1,430 holdings (45.5%) belonged to the urban ones, and 1,713 holdings (54.5%) to the rural population. Hence it can be concluded that a significant part of the urban population is regularly or additionally engaged in agriculture.

=== Gender structure ===
According to the gender structure, in the city and in the municipality as a whole, the male population slightly prevails with a share in the municipality with 50.8%, and in the city with 50.2%. Regarding the mechanical movement of the population, according to the statistical data taken from the National Statistical Office, the migration balance for 1994 and 1998 is negative and amounts to 28 and 29 emigrants, respectively.

=== Education ===
The educational process in the municipality of Delčevo is given great importance, but in the past it previously had an assimilative role. For the first time in the summer of 1944, the Macedonian language was heard in schools. Today, the educational activity is performed in two Primary schools and one state secondary school. Vančo Prke Primary School has four regional schools, two of which are eight-year schools in the villages of Bigla and Dramche and two four-year schools in the villages of Gabrovo and Zvegor. St. Kliment Ohridski Elementary School has five regional schools, of which three are eight-year schools in the villages Razlovci, Trabotivishte and Grad, and two four-year schools in Virce and Stamer. In both schools, classes are attended by about 1,970 students from first to eighth grade and about 100 children in preschool education, while the educational process is performed by 134 teachers and educators. A secondary school was opened in Delčevo in 1961, Metodi Mitevski Brico Secondary School. Today, it is attended by about 1,120 students, and 64 teachers are involved in the teaching process. The school has a branch in the neighboring municipality – Makedonska Kamenica.

== Government and politics ==
In order to perform certain administrative, professional and other activities within the competencies for which the Municipality independently decides, as well as for the entrusted competencies, administrative bodies of the Municipality are formed. Administrative bodies are formed as Inspections, departments, sections and reports. Administrative bodies are formed as services, offices and clerks. The administrative and administrative bodies are established by the Municipal council with a special decision which more closely regulates the organization, the manner and the scope of work.

The Municipal council is a representative body of the citizens. The Municipal Council consists of 15 representatives of citizens elected in general, direct and free elections by secret ballot. The members of the council are elected for a period of four years in accordance with the Law. The member of the Council cannot be recalled. The Municipal Council elects a chairman from among the members of the council for a term of four years.

The Chairman of the Council convenes and chairs the sessions of the Municipal Council; takes care of the organization and work of the council, signs the decisions and acts of the council and submits them to the Mayor for proclamation and publication. The members and the chairman of the Council take and sign a solemn statement.

The Municipal Council has a secretary. The Secretary is elected by the Municipal Council for the duration of their term. A person graduated as a lawyer with at least six years of experience in the profession is elected Secretary of the council, in a manner and procedure determined by the Rules of Procedure of the council. The Secretary of the Council may not be a member of the council. The Secretary of the Council performs the professional, administrative and organizational work of the council and its working bodies. The Secretary of the Council coordinates the activities of the administrative and administrative bodies of the Municipality when they perform tasks within the competence of the Municipal Council.

The mayor of the municipality of Delčevo is Goran Trajkovski from the ranks of SDSM. He was elected in the 2021 local elections for a four-year term. The council of the municipality of Delčevo is composed of 15 members. According to the local elections of 2021, with eight members from SDSM, six from VMRO-DPMNE, and one from Levica, the members of the council for the mandate 2021–2025 are:

- Goce Popov (President)
- Dejan Georgievski
- Zekir Abdulov
- Sunchica Gjorgjieva
- Mario Skakarski
- Bojana Gocevska
- Kiril Trenchovski
- Jasmina Kjurchiska
- Toni Stamenkovski
- Sashko Ivanovski
- Ivan Gocevski
- Eli Rizova Angelovska
- Stefanija A. Jovakovski
- Olivera Tashevska
- Marjancho Velinovski

== Culture ==
The most important cultural-scientific event is Gocevi Denovi (Goce's days) which is traditionally held every year, at the beginning of June. The event first started in Delčevo in 1966 and soon gained an international character from local to state.

The celebrations on the occasion of the anniversaries of the Razlovci uprising, the first of most uprisings in Macedonian history, are also important for Delčevo.

At the traditional Golachki folklorni sredbi (Golak folklore meetings) which are held every year on the 8th and 9th of August, cultural and artistic societies from Delčevo and neighboring municipalities present some of the region's folklore. Representatives from the sister city of Jagodina, Serbia, and from the neighbouring municipality of Simitli, Bulgaria, are also present.

=== Cultural heritage ===
Churches and monasteries built in the mid-19th and early 20th centuries are landmarks for Delčevo and the surrounding areas. The most important and oldest is the church of St. Petka in Selnik, built in the 13th century and painted in the 16th century.

The church "St. Tsar Constantine and Helena "in Razlovci, built in the middle of the 19th century is of particular importance because among the portraits of the saints is the portrait of priest Stojan, the leader of the Razlovci uprising. It is even more significant that here is an application of the Ancient Macedonian heraldic symbol – the sixteen-pointed star from Kutles.

Next to the city, to the left of the road Delčevo – Golak, on the foundations of the old monastery is built a new one, dedicated to St. Bogorodica (St. Mother of Jesus). The construction of a new Cathedral church in the center of the city is underway, which will be named after the all-Slavic educators, the holy brothers Cyril and Methodius.

No less important historical sites are the medieval tower near Petrashevec and the ancient site "Gradiste" near the village Grad. There are a number of sites on the territory of the municipality that have not been explored yet.

=== Folk wear and embroidery ===
The abundance of wool, hemp and cotton in the past provided favorable opportunities for the development of textile creativity in which the skill, ingenuity and spirit of living of a woman as a folk artist are woven.

They processed the textile raw materials with self-made tools, made with a lot of feelings.

The basic element of the women's costume is the long-sleeved cotton shirt on which they wore woolen clothes called saya and anteria long below the knees, with and without sleeves, opened in advance along the entire length, decorated with braids and belts. The women's everyday costume also includes the woolen skirt called futa, a belt, woolen knitted socks and a head covering.

Populated places in Delčevo Municipality
village(s): Bigla | Čiflik | Dramče | Dzvegor | Gabrovo | Grad | Iliovo | Kiselica | Kosovo Dabje | Nov Istevnik | Očipala | Poleto | Razlovci | Selnik | Stamer | Star Istevnik | Trabotovište | Turija | Vetren | Virče | Vratislavci Towns: Delčevo
