= 377th Rifle Division =

377th Rifle Division (August 1941 – 1945)
- Prewar photo of Maj. Gen. N. P. Kovalchuk
- Active: 1941 - 1945
- Country: Soviet Union
- Branch: Red Army
- Type: Division
- Role: Infantry
- Engagements: Battle of Leningrad; Lyuban Offensive Operation; Leningrad–Novgorod Offensive; Battle of Narva; Pskov-Ostrov Offensive; Baltic Offensive; Riga Offensive; Courland Pocket
- Decorations: Order of the Red Banner
- Battle honours: Valga

Commanders
- Notable commanders: Col. Kantemir Tsalikov; Maj. Gen. Nikolai Prokopevich Kovalchuk; Col. Semyon Sergeevich Safronov; Col. Timofei Dmitrievich Dudorov; Col. Andrei Markovich Kartavenko

The 377th Rifle Division was raised in 1941 as an infantry division of the Red Army, and served for the duration of the Great Patriotic War in that role. It began forming in August 1941 in the Urals Military District. It followed a very similar combat path to that of the 374th and 376th Rifle Divisions. It joined the fighting front in December with the 4th Army, and then briefly came under command of 2nd Shock Army, but soon moved to the 59th Army along the Volkhov River, and continued to serve in this Army's battles near Leningrad until early 1944. The division took very heavy casualties during the Lyuban Offensive in several attempts to relieve the beleaguered 2nd Shock Army. After rebuilding the division held the Army's bridgehead over the Volkhov during 1943, and finally advanced during the Leningrad–Novgorod Offensive in January 1944, taking part in the assault that liberated Novgorod. During the spring the division saw heavy fighting in the battles for Narva before moving south for the summer offensive into the Baltic states. In September it won a battle honor in the liberation of Valga, and in October also received the Order of the Red Banner for its part in the liberation of Riga. The division ended the war in Latvia, helping to contain and reduce the German forces trapped in the Courland Pocket, and was disbanded later in 1945.

== Formation ==
The 377th began forming in August 1941 in the Urals Military District at Chebarkul in the Chelyabinsk Oblast, based on the first wartime shtat (table of organization and equipment) for rifle divisions. Its order of battle was as follows:

- 1247th Rifle Regiment
- 1249th Rifle Regiment
- 1251st Rifle Regiment
- 933rd Artillery Regiment
- 381st Antiaircraft Battery (later 657th Antiaircraft Battalion) (until 25 April 1943)
- 384th Antitank Battalion (from 20 January 1942)
- 423rd Mortar Battalion (until 25 October 1942)
- 432nd Reconnaissance Company
- 440th Sapper Battalion
- 768th (later 821st) Signal Battalion (later 821st Signal Company)
- 455th Medical/Sanitation Battalion
- 448th Chemical Protection (Anti-gas) Company
- 485th Motor Transport Company
- 224th Field Bakery
- 793rd Divisional Veterinary Hospital
- 1444th Field Postal Station
- 743rd Field Office of the State Bank

Col. Kantemir Tsalikov was assigned to command of the division on 15 September, and he would remain in command until 7 September 1942. In November the division was assigned to the 39th Army, but was reassigned to the 4th Army in the Volkhov Front by 17 December. It was moved to 2nd Shock Army for a few weeks in January 1942, but by 21 January it was finally assigned to the 59th Army, where it would remain until February 1944.

== Lyuban Offensive Operation ==
Volkhov Front, including 59th Army, began the offensive on Lyuban, which was intended to break the German siege of Leningrad, on the morning of 6 January, but the Soviet forces were far from fully prepared and by the end of the day this initial assault expired in the face of heavy resistance. On 10 January the STAVKA called a three day halt in the attacks. During this period Stalin sent his special emissary and "fixer" L. Z. Mekhlis to the Front to supervise the attack preparations. While personally he was universally loathed and feared, Mekhlis' interventions were in some respects positive:

"For example, when he learned that the attacking armies were without artillery and that the available guns lacked vital parts, including optical instruments and communications equipment, Mekhlis informed Stalin. Soon, General N. Voronov, the chief of the Red Army's Artillery was sent to Malaya Vishera with several railway cars containing the missing equipment."

Volkhov Front and the 54th Army of Leningrad Front resumed the offensive early on 13 January preceded by much more powerful artillery preparation. On 17 January, 2nd Shock resumed its attack, supported by more than 1,500 aircraft sorties, and finally penetrated the Germans' first defensive positions on the west bank of the Volkhov, advanced 5 – 10 km and created conditions that Front commander Army Gen. K. A. Meretskov considered favorable for developing success. Early on the 22nd, he proposed to the STAVKA, in part: "The Front reserve will consist of the 46th Tank Brigade and the 377th Rifle Division in the Glady region and the 87th Cavalry Division in the Bolshaia Vishera region."

In late March the German 18th Army was able to pinch off communications to 2nd Shock Army and elements of 59th Army in the pocket south of Lyuban. On 30 March and again on 8 April Volkhov Front's attacks opened small gaps of 2 km to 6 km in width through the German cordon, but these were considered inadequate. A new offensive by the 59th was planned, but the spring rainy period set in, bringing everything but foot traffic to a halt. On 23 April Volkhov Front was disbanded and the Army entered the Volkhov Group of Forces of Leningrad Front, but Volkhov Front was reestablished in June. Leningrad Front planned a new operation beginning on 6 May to liquidate the northern pincer of the German semi-encirclement; the 377th was to have attacked from the east but the plan was scrapped in the face of German reinforcements. This led to the decision to finally withdraw 2nd Shock from the pocket. The breakout began on 17 May with 59th Army attacking from the east to assist, but it could not fulfill its mission because its divisions were woefully understrength.

Colonel Tsalikov left command of the division on 9 September. He was replaced a week later by Col. Nikolai Prokofevich Kovalchuk. Kovalchuk was briefly replaced by Col. Leonid Gavrilovich Sergeev on 2 January 1943, but returned to command on 2 February, and was promoted to the rank of major general on 18 May.

== Leningrad-Novgorod Offensive ==
On 28 August General Kovalchuk, who was already serving as chief of staff of 59th Army, handed his command to Col. Semyon Sergeevich Safronov. In preparation for this upcoming offensive, in November the 377th came under its first corps command, the 112th Rifle Corps, where it would remain until April 1944. When the drive on Novgorod began on 14 January 1944, this Corps was in the second echelon of 59th Army. Over the next four days the Army made a slow but inexorable advance north and south of the city, threatening to envelop the German forces defending it. On the 18th, Lt. Gen. I. T. Korovnikov committed the 112th Corps to protect the Army's right flank and cooperate with 54th Army in the encirclement and destruction of two German corps in the Lyuban - Chudovo region. On the morning of 20 January elements of the 7th and 14th Rifle Corps liberated Novgorod.

The next objective for 59th Army, and Volkhov Front as a whole, was the town of Luga. Korovnikov resumed his offensive on 21 January and provided significant engineer support to cross the roadless and heavily forested swampland spanning the entire region east of Luga. 6th Rifle Corps attacked westward through Batetsky to Luga, supported on the right by 112th Corps. However the advance faltered badly on 24 January after only minimal gains. 6th Corps was tired and badly understrength, and Meretskov criticized Korovnikov for the slow advance, noting that both Corps "... failed to maneuver properly, made little use of their ski battalions, paid scant attention to adequate reconnaissance, and, when they encountered German strongpoints, frequently resorted to frontal attacks." Following a regrouping within the Front, when the advance on Luga resumed on 27 January the 59th Army contained only the 6th and 112th Corps and 29th Tank Brigade. In three days of heavy fighting the 112th fought its way across the Luga River, reaching to within 18 km of Oredezh by 30 January. 18th Army finally abandoned Luga on 12 February just as forces of 67th Army prepared to envelop the town and the forward detachment of the 377th was approaching from the southeast.

=== Battle of Narva ===
By 1 March the 377th, still in 112th Corps with the 2nd Rifle Division, was reassigned to 8th Army in Leningrad Front. During March the Army was primarily involved in holding the line along the Narva River south to Lake Chud, but in April, the 59th Army was replaced by the 8th in the Krivasoo bridgehead west of Narva. Prior to this transition the 377th was transferred to the withdrawing 59th, and as of 1 May was the only division in the Army. A month later it was still a separate rifle division in 59th Army, but at the beginning of July it was back in 8th Army, in the 124th Rifle Corps.

== Baltic Offensive ==
At the beginning of August the 377th was in 1st Shock Army, now in the 3rd Baltic Front, moving south towards Pskov near the shores of Lake Pskov. On 20 August Colonel Safronov handed his command over to Col. Timofei Dmitrievich Dudorov. Over the next six weeks the division fought its way into Latvia and Estonia, moving to the 111th Rifle Corps of 67th Army, and on 19 September it was recognized as follows:

"VALGA... 377th Rifle Division (Col. Dudorov, Timofei Dmitrievich)... The troops who participated in the liberation of Valga, by the order of the Supreme High Command of September 19, 1944, and a commendation in Moscow, are given a salute of 12 artillery salvoes from 124 guns.

On 1 October Colonel Dudorov was succeeded briefly by Col. Ivan Trofimovich Teslya, but two weeks later Teslya was replaced by Col. Andrei Markovich Kartavenko, who would lead the division for the duration of the war. In the first week of October the 377th was near the Gulf of Riga in the area of Salacgrīva. The division played a major role in the liberation of Riga, and received the award of the Order of the Red Banner on 31 October. Previous to this, on 17 October the division was recognized for its part in the liberation of Rīgas Jūrmala.

== Battle of Courland ==
After the battle for Riga the 3rd Baltic Front was disbanded and by the end of the month the 377th was transferred with its 112th Corps to the 1st Shock Army in 2nd Baltic Front. It remained in that Army until April 1945, mostly in 112th Corps, but that month the Corps was transferred back to 67th Army, which was now part of the Courland Group of Forces of Leningrad Front. The division ended the war near the Baltic Sea, still watching over the German forces trapped in the Courland Pocket.

== Postwar ==
The division ended the war with the full title: 377th Rifle, Valga, Order of the Red Banner Division (Russian: 377-я стрелковая Валгинская Краснознамённая дивизия). It was disbanded later in 1945.
