= Kosowo =

Kosowo is the Polish name for Kosovo and may refer to the following places:

- Kosowo, Nakło County in Kuyavian-Pomeranian Voivodeship (north-central Poland)
- Kosowo, Świecie County in Kuyavian-Pomeranian Voivodeship (north-central Poland)
- Kosowo, Tuchola County in Kuyavian-Pomeranian Voivodeship (north-central Poland)
- Kosowo, Gniezno County in Greater Poland Voivodeship (west-central Poland)
- Kosowo, Gostyń County in Greater Poland Voivodeship (west-central Poland)
- Kosowo, Pomeranian Voivodeship (north Poland)

== See also ==
- Kosovo (disambiguation)
- Kosów (disambiguation)
