= Dzvegor =

Zvegor Ѕвегор
- Village
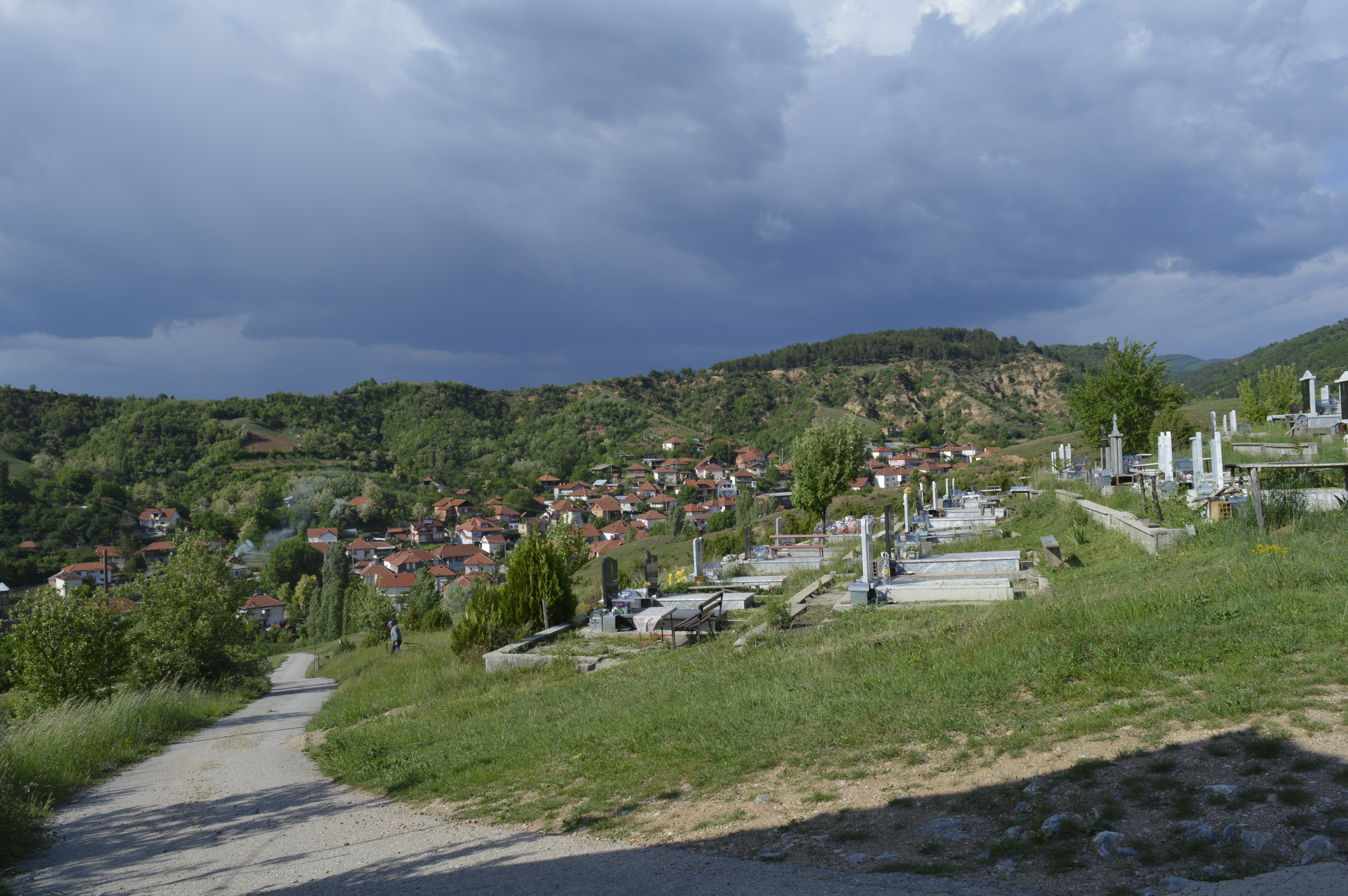
- Panoramic view of the village

- Location within North Macedonia
- Country: North Macedonia
- Region: Eastern
- Municipality: Delčevo

Population (2002)
  - Total: 904
- Time zone: UTC+1 (CET)
  - Summer (DST): UTC+2 (CEST)
- Website: .

Dzvegor (Macedonian: Ѕвегор) is a village in the municipality of Delčevo, North Macedonia. It is the final settlement along the main road from Delčevo to the border with Bulgaria along a route that continues to Blagoevgrad.

== Demographics ==
According to the statistics of Bulgarian ethnographer Vasil Kanchov from 1900 the settlement is written as "Zvegor" and as having 355 inhabitants, 335 Bulgarian Muslims, 20 Romani. As of the 2002 census, the village had a total of 904 inhabitants. Ethnic groups in the village include Macedonians and Turks.
