= Izbišta =

Izbišta Избишта
- Village
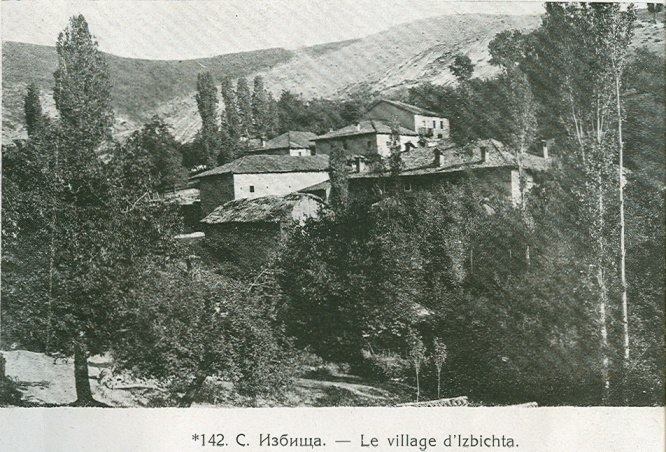
- Izbišta around 1910

- Location within North Macedonia
- Coordinates: 41°07′54″N 21°00′14″E
- Country: North Macedonia
- Region: Pelagonia
- Municipality: Resen

Population (2002)
  - Total: 176
- Time zone: UTC+1 (CET)
  - Summer (DST): UTC+2 (CEST)
- Area code: +389
- Car plates: RE

Izbišta (Macedonian: Избишта) is a village in the Resen Municipality of North Macedonia. It is located some 4.6 kilometres (2.9 mi) north of the municipal centre of Resen, It is also called Izbiste, and is only a few metres from the road that leads to the village of Leva Reka, and the city of Ohrid. It is close to the entry to the mountain pass between the Galičica and Bigla mountain ranges. The village is also home to FK Ilinden, a local football club.

== Demographics ==
Izbišta has 176 residents as of the most recent census in 2002. The village's population has historically consisted mainly of ethnic Macedonians.

Ethnic group	census 1961		census 1971		census 1981		census 1991		census 1994		census 2002	
Ethnic group	Number	%	Number	%	Number	%	Number	%	Number	%	Number	%
Macedonians	244	100.0	261	99.2	259	98.9	208	98.1	194	98.0	174	98.9
others	0	0.0	2	0.8	3	1.2	4	1.9	4	2.0	2	1.1
Total	244		263		262		212		198		176	
