= Putin's Dacha =

Putin's dacha may refer to:

- Dolgiye Borody, near Lake Valdai, Valday, Novgorod Oblast, Russia
- Putin's Palace or Putin's dacha at Cape Idokopas, on the Black Sea, Krasnodar Krai, Russia
