= Kosova, Bosnia and Herzegovina =

Kosova, Bosnia and Herzegovina may refer to:

- Kosova (Maglaj), Bosnia and Herzegovina
- Kosova, Foča, Bosnia and Herzegovina
