= Kosova (disambiguation) =

Kosova is the Albanian name of Kosovo, a partially recognised state in Southeastern Europe.

Kosova may also refer to:

== Places ==
- Kosova (Maglaj), Bosnia and Herzegovina
- Kosova, Foča, Bosnia and Herzegovina
- Kosova, Estonia

== Other uses ==
- Kosova Airlines, an airline
- Kosova Press, a news agency
- Kosova, a ship of the Ottoman Navy
- Kosova (1932 newspaper), an Albanian newspaper of 1932–1933
- Republic of Kosova (1991–1999), an unrecognized secessionist state before the Kosovo War

== See also ==
- Kosava (disambiguation)
- Kosovo (disambiguation)
- Kosova Hora, a village and municipality in the Czech Republic
- Bantu Kosova, people in Kenya who are also known as the Gusii
