= Razlovci =

Razlovci Разловци
- Village
- Location within North Macedonia
- Coordinates: 41.844034°N 22.768092°E
- Country: North Macedonia
- Region: Eastern
- Municipality: Delčevo

Population (2021)
  - Total: 461
- Time zone: UTC+1 (CET)
  - Summer (DST): UTC+2 (CEST)
- Website: .

Razlovci (Macedonian: Разловци) is a village in the municipality of Delčevo, North Macedonia.

== Demographics ==
According to the 2002 census, the village had 826 inhabitants. Ethnic groups in the village include:

- Macedonians 823
- Serbs 3

According to the census of 2021, the village had a total of 461 inhabitants, of whom 391 Macedonians, 2 Albanians and 68 people without data.
