= Košava =

Košava may refer to:

- Košava (wind), a wind in Serbia and nearby countries
- Košava (film), a 1974 Yugoslav film
- Radio Košava, a radio station in Serbia, and a label of Viktorija
- TV Košava, a Serbian television station
- Koshava, Bulgaria, also transliterated as Košava, a village in Vidin Municipality in Bulgaria

== See also ==
- Koshava (disambiguation)
- Kosava (disambiguation)
