= Kopačka (folklore ensemble) =

Folklore Ensamble from North Macedonia

Kopačka (Macedonian: Копачка) is a folklore musical ensemble from Dramče, Macedonia. Founded in 1948, it is the oldest of its kind in Macedonia, even older than the most famous Macedonian folklore ensemble Tanec, which was founded in 1949. The ensemble is best known for the dance with the same name Kopačka.

In November 2008, the Kopačka ensemble marked its 60 years jubilee. There was also a guest ensemble from Melnik, Bulgaria.

== See also ==
- Kopačka (folk dance)
