= Poleto, Delčevo =

Poleto Полето
- Village
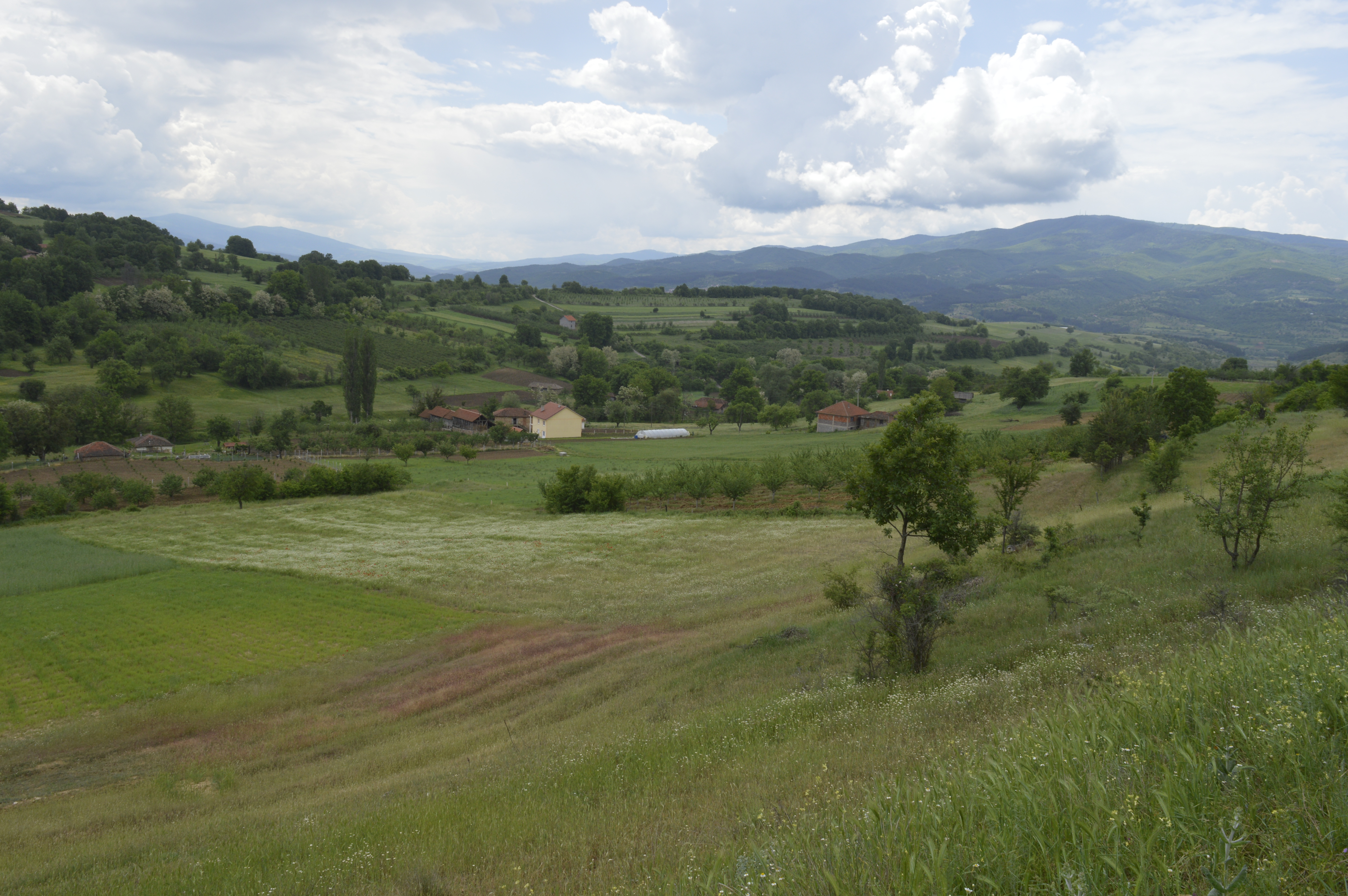

- Location within North Macedonia
- Coordinates: 42.002739°N 22.763239°E
- Country: North Macedonia
- Region: Eastern
- Municipality: Delčevo

Population (2021)
  - Total: 198
- Time zone: UTC+1 (CET)
  - Summer (DST): UTC+2 (CEST)
- Website: .

Poleto (Macedonian: Полето) is a village in the municipality of Delčevo, North Macedonia.

== Demographics ==
As of the 2021 census, Poleto had 198 residents with the following ethnic composition:

- Macedonians 192
- Persons for whom data are taken from administrative sources 3
- Albanians 2
- Others 1

According to the 2002 census, the village had a total of 194 inhabitants. Ethnic groups in the village include:

- Macedonians 186
- Romani 8
