= Names of Kosovo =

The name Kosovo (as referred to in this spelling) is the most frequently used form in English when discussing the region in question. The Albanian spelling Kosova has lesser currency. The alternative spellings Cossovo and Kossovo were frequently used until the early 20th century.

== Terminology ==
The toponym Kosovo in contemporary times refers to entire territory of Kosovo. Kosovo originally referred to plain of Kosovo, which forms part of eastern Kosovo. Regions which are today considered parts of Kosovo include Dukagjin/Metohija, Llapusha, Llap and other areas. Kosovo was used as the name of the entire territory for the first time in 1877 when the Kosovo Vilayet was created by the Ottoman administration.

== In antiquity ==
=== Dardania ===
There is a theory within linguistics that the name Dardania used in ancient times for the area of Kosovo is derived from the Albanian word dardhë, meaning "pear".

Due to its Slavic (Serbian) character, Kosovo Albanian leader Ibrahim Rugova supported a name change to "Dardania", in reference to the ancient kingdom and later-turned Roman province. It, however, did not enter into general usage.

== Medieval and contemporary ==
=== Kosovo ===
Kosovo (Serbian Cyrillic: Косово) is the Serbian neuter possessive adjective of kos (кос), meaning "blackbird"; -ovo being an adjectival suffix – it is short for the region named the "field of the blackbird" (Serbian: Kosovo polje), the Kosovo Field, the site of the 1389 battle between a coalition led by Serbian Prince Lazar and the Ottoman army, which resulted in depletion of Serbian available manpower in future campaigns. The name Kosovo Kos- is found in hundreds of Slavic locations. The cognate of Proto-Slavic kosь is Ancient Greek κόσσυφος.

Linguistic and historical research have shown that the medieval Serb state expanded into the region during the twelfth century. Many toponyms in Kosovo appear to be South Slavic. The name Kosovo appears in Bulgaria as Kosovo, Plovdiv Province.

=== Arnavudluk (Albania) ===
Kosovo was part of the Ottoman state for 457 years.

Ottoman traveller Evliya Çelebi, who went to the area in 1660 referred to central Kosovo as Arnavud (آرناوود) and noted that in Vushtrri its inhabitants were speakers of Albanian or Turkish and few spoke "Boşnakca". The highlands around the Tetovo, Peja and Prizren areas Çelebi considered as being the "mountains of Arnavudluk". Çelebi referred to the "mountains of Peja" as being in Arnavudluk and considered the Ibar river that converged in Mitrovica as forming Kosovo's border with Bosnia. He viewed the "Kılab" or Llapi river as having its source in Arnavudluk and by extension the Sitnica as being part of that river. Çelebi also included the central mountains of Kosovo within Arnavudluk.

During Ottoman rule the area of Kosovo was referred to as Arnavudluk (آرناوودلق) meaning Albania by the empire in its documents such as those dating from the eighteenth century.

=== Gegalik (Gegënia) ===
In the late Ottoman period Albanians claimed the sancaks of Yeni Pazar (Novi Pazar), Ipek (Peja), Prizren, Priștine (Pristina) and Üsküp (Skopje) which were all within Kosovo Vilayet as forming part of Gegalık or Land of the Gegs, a term named after Gheg Albanians who inhabited the area.

=== Kosovo and Metohija ===
The name "Kosovo and Metohija" was used for the autonomous province in Yugoslav Serbia since its creation in 1945 until 1968, when the term "Metohija" was dropped. In 1990, the name was reversed to "Kosovo and Metohija". After the Kosovo War, the United Nations mission used only "Kosovo" as the name of the province.

== See also ==
- Kosovo
- Kosovo (disambiguation)
- Dardani

== Sources ==
- Fábián, Annamaria; Trost, Igor, eds. (2019). Sprachgebrauch in der Politik: Grammatische, lexikalische, pragmatische, kulturelle und dialektologische Perspektiven. De Gruyter. ISBN 978-3110637731.

By ISO 639-3 code
Enter an ISO code to find the corresponding language article.
