= Trabotivište =

Trabotivište Тработивиште
- Village
- Location within North Macedonia
- Coordinates: 41.890729°N 22.815074°E
- Country: North Macedonia
- Region: Eastern
- Municipality: Delčevo

Population (2002)
  - Total: 533
- Time zone: UTC+1 (CET)
  - Summer (DST): UTC+2 (CEST)
- Website: .

Trabotivište (Macedonian: Тработивиште) is a village in the municipality of Delčevo, North Macedonia.

== Demographics ==
According to the 2002 census, the village had a total of 533 inhabitants. Ethnic groups in the village include:

- Macedonians 446
- Turks 5
- Serbs 1
- Romani 79
- Others 2
