= Kosovo Polje (disambiguation) =

Kosovo Polje is a town in central Kosovo.

Kosovo Polje (Serbian Cyrillic: Косово Поље, lit. 'Kosovo Field') may also refer to:

- Kosovo field, a large karst field, historical battlefield
- Kosovo Polje railway station
- Kosovo Polje (Višegrad), a settlement in Bosnia and Herzegovina
- Kosovo polje (Croatia), a small karst field near Knin
