= Nov Istevnik =

Nov Istevnik Нов Истевник
- Village
- Location within North Macedonia
- Coordinates: 41.862082°N 22.831784°E
- Country: North Macedonia
- Region: Eastern
- Municipality: Delčevo

Population (2002)
  - Total: 144
- Time zone: UTC+1 (CET)
  - Summer (DST): UTC+2 (CEST)
- Website: .

Nov Istevnik (Macedonian: Нов Истевник) is a village in the municipality of Delčevo, North Macedonia.

== Demographics ==
According to the 2002 census, the village had a total of 144 inhabitants. Ethnic groups in the village include:

- Macedonians 143
- Serbs 1
