= Kosava =

Kosava may refer to:

- Kosava, Belarus, a town
- Košava (disambiguation)

== See also ==
- Koshava (disambiguation)
- Kosova (disambiguation)
