= Grad, Delčevo =

Grad Град
- Village
- Location within North Macedonia
- Coordinates: 41.938191°N 22.842792°E
- Country: North Macedonia
- Region: Eastern
- Municipality: Delčevo

Population (2002)
  - Total: 534
- Time zone: UTC+1 (CET)
  - Summer (DST): UTC+2 (CEST)
- Website: .

Grad (Macedonian: Град) is a village in the municipality of Delčevo, North Macedonia. It is located close to the Bulgarian border.

== Demographics ==
According to the 2002 census, the village had a total of 534 inhabitants. Ethnic groups in the village include:

- Macedonians 518
- Turks 15
- Serbs 1
