= Iliovo =

Iliovo Илиово
- Village
- Location within North Macedonia
- Coordinates: 41.979054°N 22.644167°E
- Country: North Macedonia
- Region: Eastern
- Municipality: Delčevo

Population (2002)
  - Total: 127
- Time zone: UTC+1 (CET)
  - Summer (DST): UTC+2 (CEST)
- Website: .

Iliovo (Macedonian: Илиово) is a village in the municipality of Delčevo, North Macedonia.

== Demographics ==
According to the 2002 census, the village had a total of 127 inhabitants. Ethnic groups in the village include:

- Macedonian(127 people)
