= Kosovo and Metohija (disambiguation) =

Kosovo and Metohija is an autonomous province claimed by the Republic of Serbia on the territory of the partially recognized state of Kosovo.

Kosovo and Metohija may also refer to:

- Autonomous Region of Kosovo and Metohija (1945–1963), autonomous region in the People's Republic of Serbia
- Autonomous Province of Kosovo and Metohija (1963–1968), autonomous province in the Socialist Republic of Serbia
- Socialist Autonomous Province of Kosovo (1968–1990), autonomous province in the Socialist Republic of Serbia

== See also ==
- Kosovo (disambiguation)
- Metohija (disambiguation)
