= Virče =

Virče Вирче
- Village
- Location within North Macedonia
- Coordinates: 41.909206°N 22.848328°E
- Country: North Macedonia
- Region: Eastern
- Municipality: Delčevo

Population (2002)
  - Total: 498
- Time zone: UTC+1 (CET)
  - Summer (DST): UTC+2 (CEST)
- Website: .

Virče (Macedonian: Вирче) is a village in the municipality of Delčevo, North Macedonia.

== Demographics ==
According to the 2002 census, the village had a total of 498 inhabitants. Ethnic groups in the village included:

- Macedonians 496
- Serbs 1
- Others 1
