= Stamer, Delčevo =

Stamer Стамер
- Village
- Location within North Macedonia
- Coordinates: 41.951771°N 22.820205°E
- Country: North Macedonia
- Region: Eastern
- Municipality: Delčevo

Population (2002)
  - Total: 344
- Time zone: UTC+1 (CET)
  - Summer (DST): UTC+2 (CEST)
- Website: .

Stamer (Macedonian: Стамер) is a village in the municipality of Delčevo, North Macedonia.

== Demographics ==
According to the 2002 census, the village had a total of 344 inhabitants. Ethnic groups in the village include:

- Macedonians 344
