= Shum-gora =

Large kurgan in Novgorod Oblast, Russia

Coordinates: 58°30′23″N 30°14′43″E

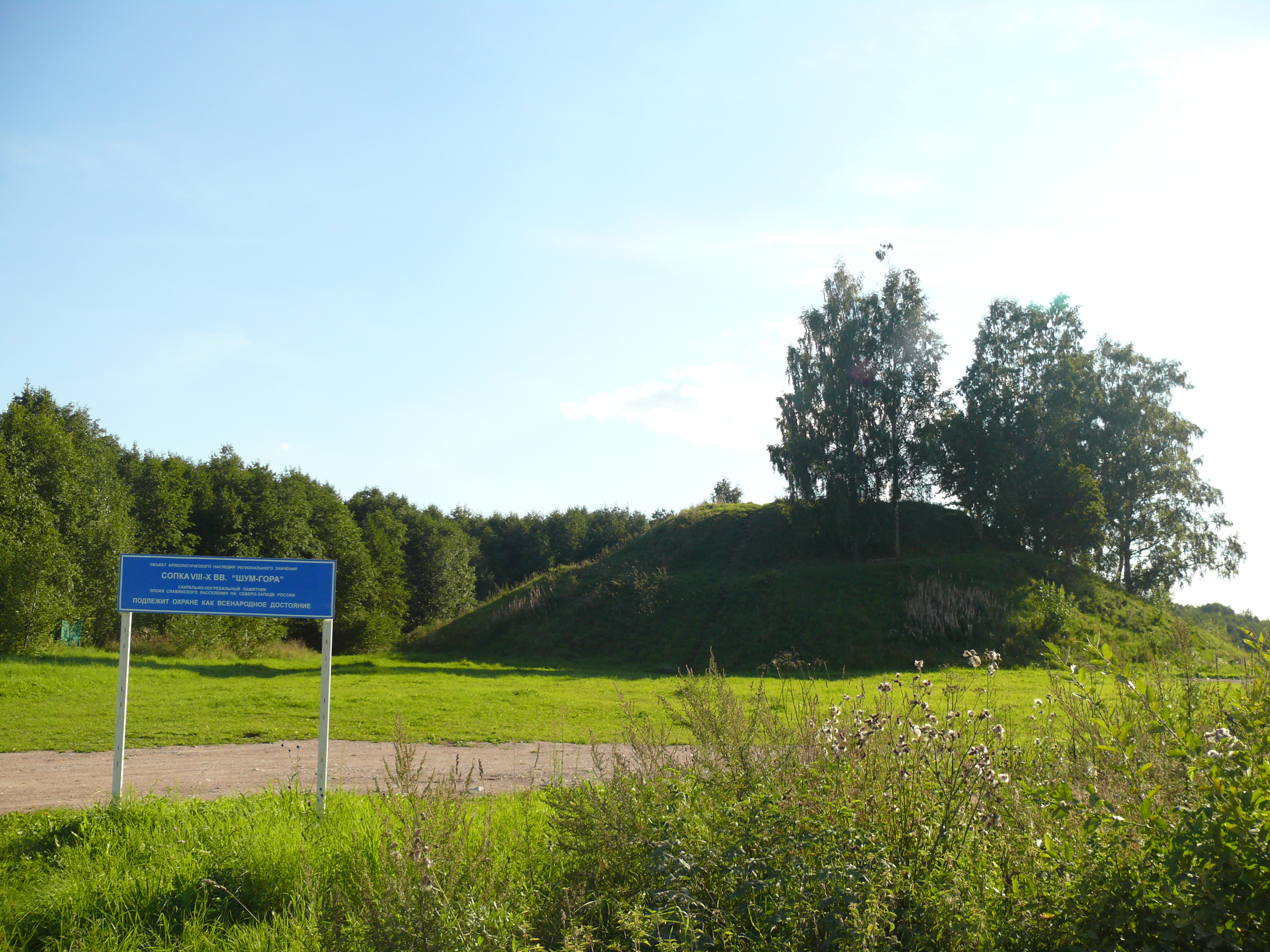
Shum-gora, August 2013, as viewed from the North-East

Shum Gora (Russian: Шум-гора, lit. 'Noise Hill') is a massive kurgan (tumulus) situated in Peredolskaya Volost, near the bank of the Luga River, Batetsky District, Novgorod Oblast, northwestern Russia, about 60 km west of Novgorod.

The hill was formerly involved in local liturgical practice. 19th century sources record that three crosses standing on its top, but by the 20th century these had been removed. During the mid 19th century, there used to be processions, with pilgrims walking three times around the hill before ascending it to "listen to the noise" and leave small sacrifices in a pit at the top. People suffering from headache used to put sand from the pit in their ears. These practices are described by A. A. Panchenko in 1998. The site and the associated folk customs were first described by M. Bystrov in 1879. Bystrov records the tradition that the sand from the hill had miraculous power on Trinity Sunday, and that if the hill was ascended on that day, the sound of bells could be heard if one "listened in a special way", and that on this day, pilgrims from as far as 50 miles away would come to the hill in hope of curing headaches.

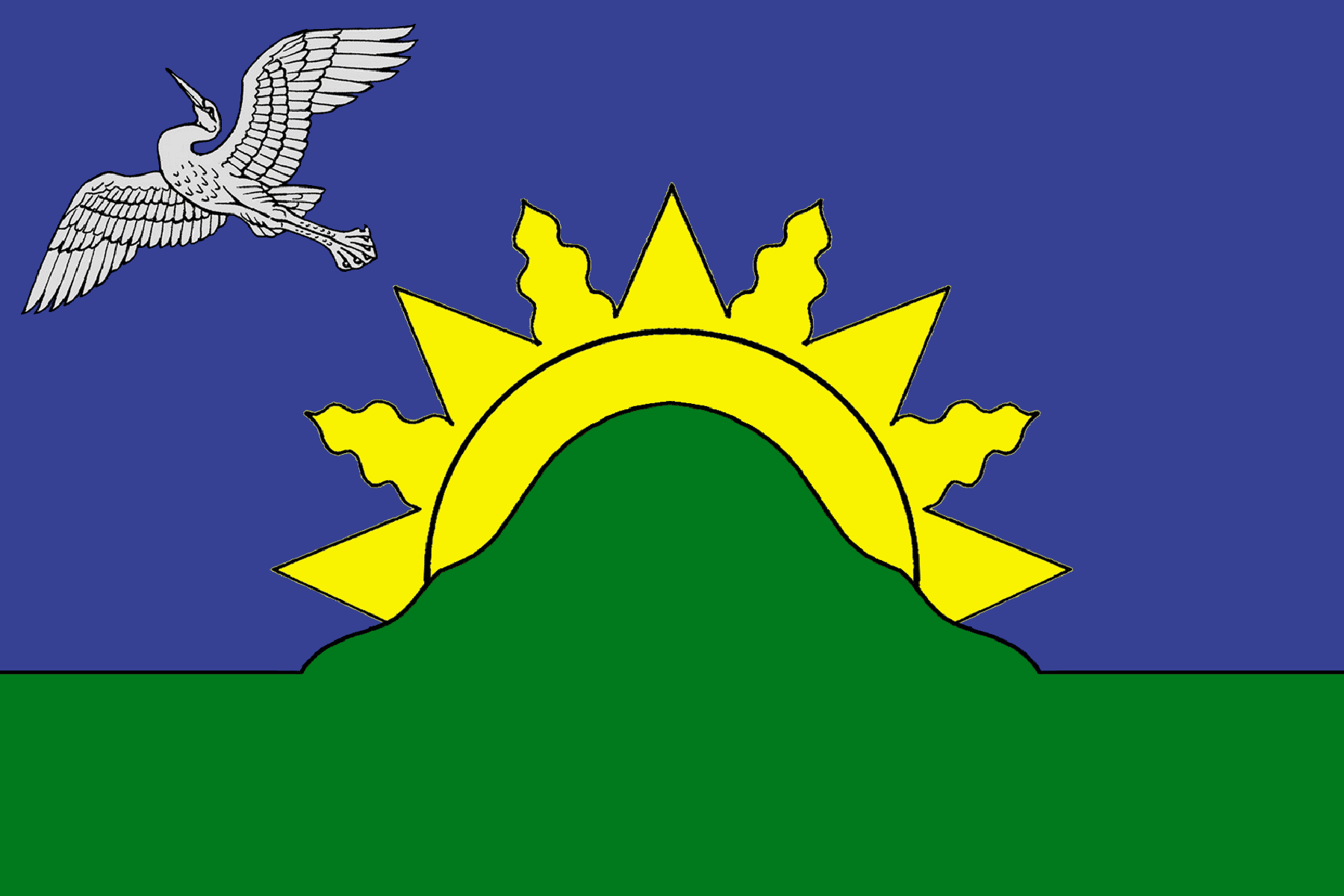
Batetsky District, one of the districts of Novgorod Oblast, in June 2010 adopted a flag design that includes the silouhette of Shum-Gora together with a rising sun and a stork.

The kurgan has not been excavated, but in 2002 a georadar survey was performed by the Russian Federal Geological Institute (ВСЕГЕИ), and in 2003 to 2004, the Institute for the History of Material Culture of the Russian Academy of Sciences has done experimental surveys testing non-intrusive archaeological methods. The kurgan is 14.6 m in height and 70 m in diameter, comparable in proportion to the largest Migration era tumuli in Scandinavia such as Raknehaugen.

Aleksashin (2006) discusses a boulder with a monogrammatic inscription he found on the hill in 2003. He compares the inscription to Carolingian monograms and based on this revives the theory which identifies Rurik, the founder of the Kievan Rus, with Rorik of Dorestad.
