= Selnik, North Macedonia =

Selnik Селник
- Village
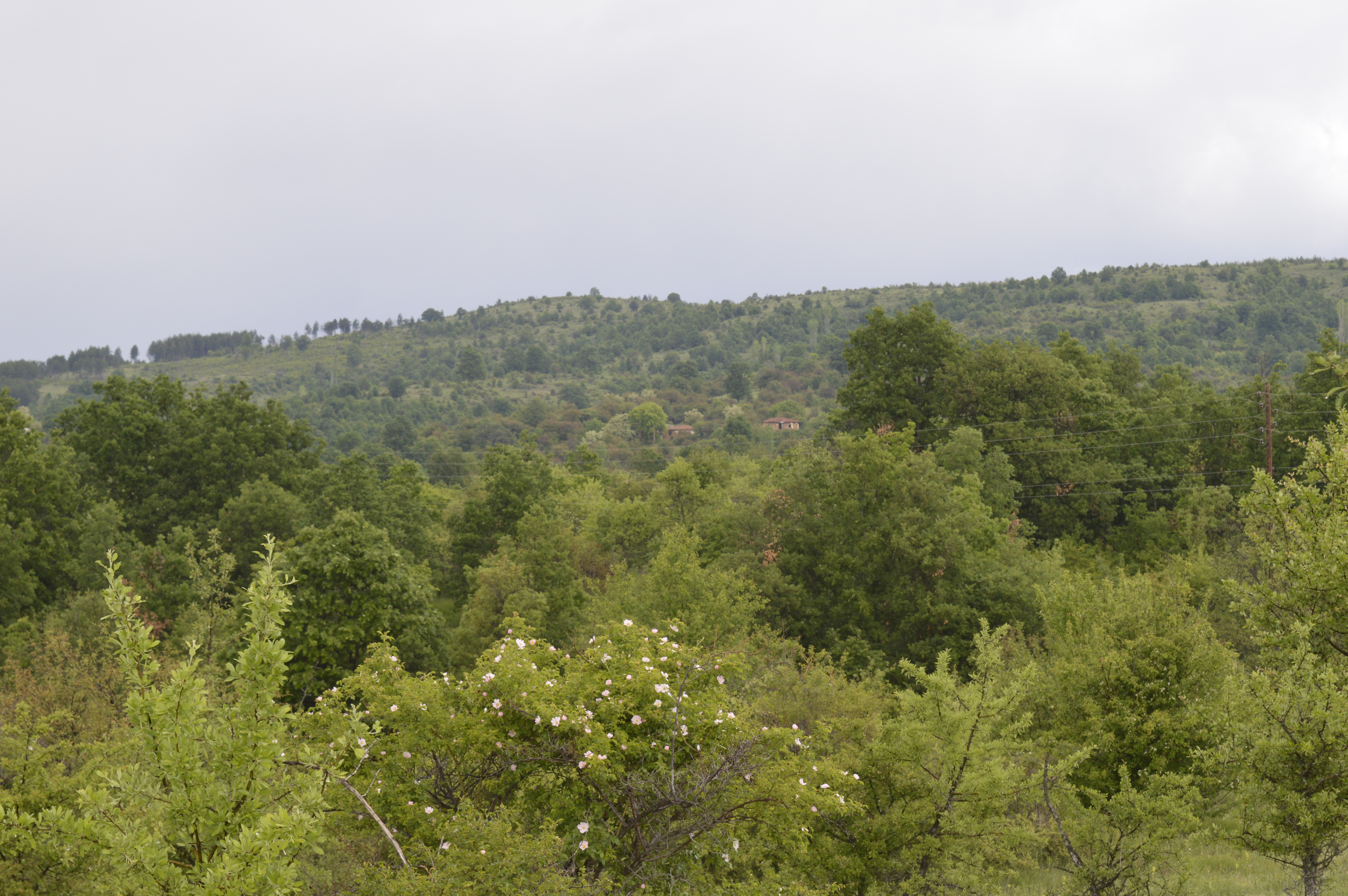
- Panoramic view of the village

- Location within North Macedonia
- Country: North Macedonia
- Region: Eastern
- Municipality: Delčevo

Population (2002)
  - Total: 28
- Time zone: UTC+1 (CET)
  - Summer (DST): UTC+2 (CEST)
- Website: .

Selnik (Macedonian: Селник) is a small village in the municipality of Delčevo, North Macedonia. It is situated on one of the mountains next to the town of Delčevo and close to the Bulgarian border. Parts of the village are named after Sezotove's old family clans who settled there long time ago, for example Lesovci (named after the family name Lesovski).

== History ==
At the beginning of the 20th century, Selnik was a village in Maleshevo kaza of the Ottoman Empire. According to a census of Vasil Kanchov ("Macedonia. Ethnography and statistics" in the year 1900, Selnik was a small village with 120 Christian Bulgarians. The "La Macédoine et sa Population Chrétienne" survey by Dimitar Mishev (D. Brankov) concluded that village has 112 Exarchist Bulgarians in 1905.

== Demographics ==
According to the 2002 census, the village had a total of 28 inhabitants. Ethnic groups in the village include:

- Macedonians 28

== See also ==
- Delčevo municipality
- Delčevo
- North Macedonia
