= Abramkovo =

Abramkovo Абрамково
- Village
- Location within Novgorod Oblast Location within Russia
- Coordinates: 57°58′N 29°55′E
- Country: Russia
- Region: Novgorod Oblast
- District: Soletsky District
- Time zone: [[UTC+3:00]] (CET)

Abramkovo (Russian: Абрамково) is a rural locality (a village) in Gorskoye Rural Settlement of Soletsky District, Novgorod Oblast, Russia. The population was 45 as of 2010. There is 1 street.

== Geography ==
The village is located on the right bank of the Shelon River, 33 km southwest of Soltsy (the district's administrative centre) by road. Petrovo is the nearest rural locality.
