= Abrosovo, Ivanovo Oblast =

Abrosovo Абросово
- Village
- Location within Ivanovo Oblast Location within Russia
- Coordinates: 56°51′N 42°26′E
- Country: Russia
- Region: Ivanovo Oblast
- District: Verkhnelandekhovsky District
- Time zone: UTC+3:00

Abrosovo (Russian: Абросово) is a rural locality (a village) in Kromskoye Rural Settlement of Verkhnelandekhovsky District, Ivanovo Oblast, Russia. The population was 14 as of 2010.

== Geography ==
Abrosovo is located 18 km west of Verkhny Landekh (the district's administrative centre) by road. Yefremovo is the nearest rural locality.
