= Kosovo Polje (Višegrad) =

Kosovo Polje Косово Поље
- Village
- Location within Bosnia and Herzegovina
- Coordinates: 43°48′N 19°17′E
- Country: Bosnia and Herzegovina
- Entity: Republika Srpska
- Municipality: Višegrad
- Time zone: UTC+1 (CET)
  - Summer (DST): UTC+2 (CEST)

Kosovo Polje (Serbian Cyrillic: Косово Поље, lit. 'Field of Blackbirds') is a village in the municipality of Višegrad, Bosnia and Herzegovina.
