= Terebutenets =

Rural locality in Novgorod Oblast, Russia

Coordinates: 59°01′15″N 33°39′02″E

Terebutenets (Russian: Теребутенец) is a rural locality (a railway station) under the administrative jurisdiction of the Urban-Type Settlement of Nebolchi in Lyubytinsky District of Novgorod Oblast, Russia, located approximately 215 kilometers (134 mi) east-southeast of Saint Petersburg, 430 kilometers (270 mi) northwest of Moscow, and about 20 kilometers (12 mi) southeast of Nebolchi.

== Geography ==
Terebutenets is situated to the northeast of the Valdai Hills amidst deciduous and coniferous forests. Close nearby, within a radius of 5–10 km, are many lakes, including Mikhaylinskoye, Siverik, and Dolgoye. Hunting and fishing are popular recreational activities in the area.

== History and demographics ==
It was founded in the 1930s. In 2010, its population was 52.

== Climate ==
Average June temperature is +18 °C (64 °F); average January temperature is −12 °C (10 °F).
