= Metohija (disambiguation) =

Metohija is a region in the southwestern part of Kosovo.

Metohija may also refer to:

- Metohija, Croatia, a village in the municipality of Ston
- Metohija, Podujevo, a village in the municipality of Podujevo, Kosovo

== See also ==
- Metohiya, a village in Treklyano Municipality, Bulgaria
- Kosovo and Metohija (disambiguation)
- Metochia
