= Kosovo, Makedonski Brod =

Village in North Macedonia

Kosovo Косово
- Village
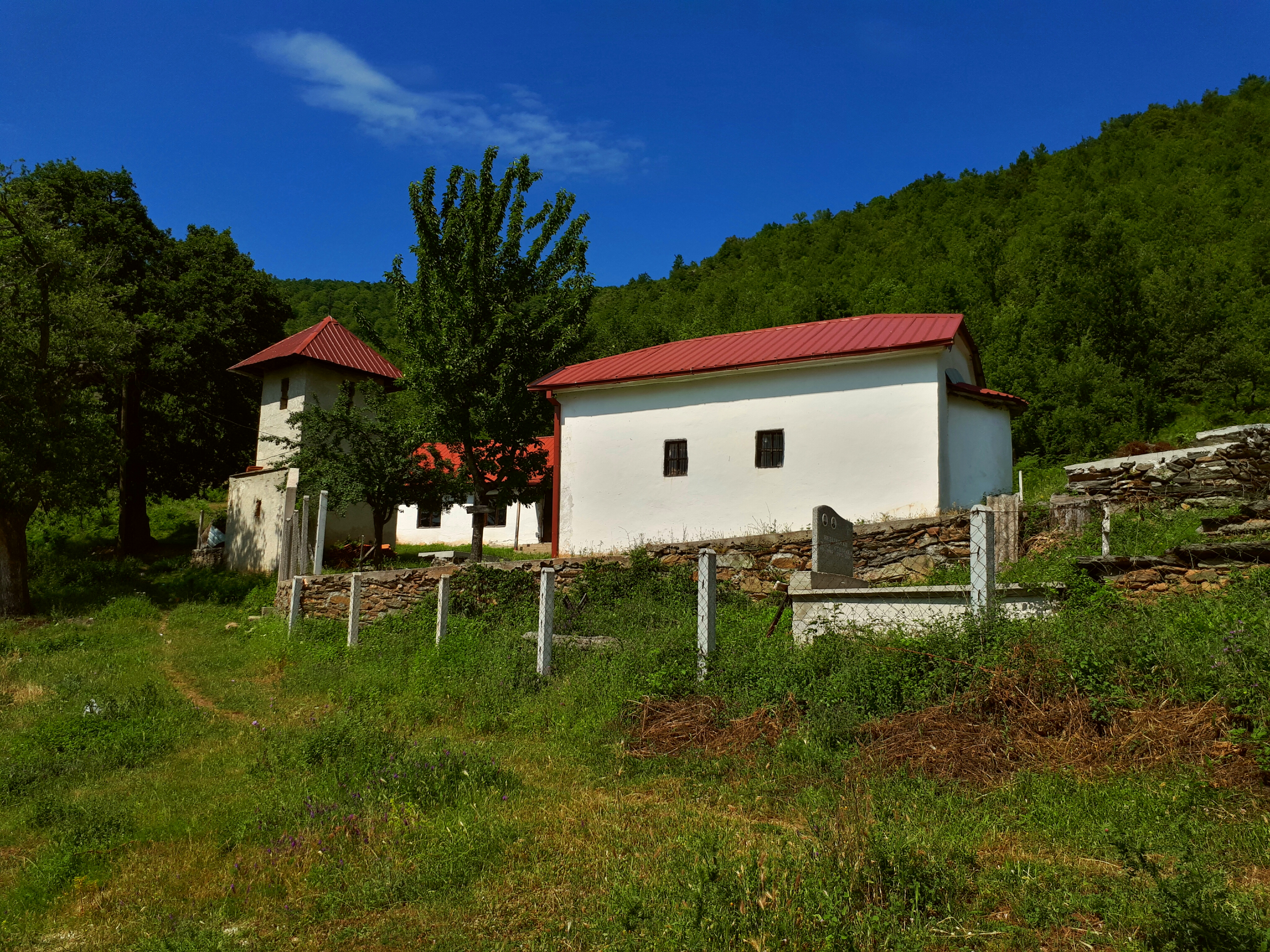
- St. George's Church in the village

- Location within North Macedonia
- Coordinates: 41.728863929106744°N 21.13426915695471°E
- Country: North Macedonia
- Region: Southwestern
- Municipality: Makedonski Brod

Population (2021)
  - Total: 54
- Time zone: UTC+1 (CET)
  - Summer (DST): UTC+2 (CEST)

Kosovo (Macedonian: Косово) is a village in the municipality of Makedonski Brod, North Macedonia.

== Demographics ==
The village is attested in the 1467/68 Ottoman tax registry (defter) for the Nahiyah of Kırçova. The village had a total of 18 houses, excluding bachelors (mucerred).

According to the 2021 census, the village had a total of 54 inhabitants.

In the 2002 census, it had a total of 67 inhabitants. Ethnic groups in the village include:

- Macedonians 44
- Albanians 3
- Оthers 1
- Persons for whom data are taken from administrative sources 6
