= Kopačka (folk dance) =

- Genre: Folk dance
- Time signature: 2/4
- Origin: Pijanec, North Macedonia

Kopačka (Macedonian: Копачка; English: The farmers dance) is a traditional Macedonian oro, folk dance, from the region of Pijanec, a range of mountains in the eastern part of North Macedonia.

Kopačka is traditionally performed by male dancers. It is a fast-paced dance with fast movements on half feet, featuring extensive jumping, side movements and scissors movements. The dancers hold their belts with their left hand over the right one and begin their dance in a position of a half circle. The dance rhythm is 2/4.

The dance was first introduced to Tanec (the national folklore performance group in North Macedonia) by the village dancers. The original name for the dance was Sitnata (Macedonian: Ситната; English: The small/fine one). Tanec changed the name to Kopačka and the dance subsequently became so famous that the villagers adopted this name of Kopačka for both the dance and the name of their group, to remind everyone whence this dance originally came.

The dance is based on a combination of two songs: Dimna Juda for the slow, walking part of the dance, and Derviško Dušo (Viško) for the fast part of the dance.

== See also ==
- Kopanitsa
- Kopačka (folklore ensemble)
- Music of North Macedonia
