= Koshava =

Koshava may refer to:

- Koshava, Bulgaria, also transliterated as Košava, a village in Vidin Municipality in Bulgaria
- Koshava Island, Antarctica, named after Koshava, Bulgaria

== See also ==
- Košava (disambiguation)
