= Mladost, Varna =

Coordinates: 43°14′N 27°53′E

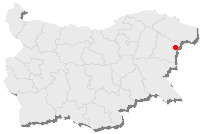

Mladost (Bulgarian: Младост) is a district of Varna, Varna Municipality in Varna Province, Bulgaria. It is situated in the northwestern part of the city. Its population is just over 87,000 according to Census 2011.

== Administrators ==
- Mayor: Hristo Hristov
