= Kosovo Dabje =

Kosovo Dabje Косово Дабје
- Village
- Location within North Macedonia
- Country: North Macedonia
- Region: Eastern
- Municipality: Delčevo

Population (2002)
  - Total: 21
- Time zone: UTC+1 (CET)
  - Summer (DST): UTC+2 (CEST)
- Website: .

Kosovo Dabje (Macedonian: Косово Дабје) is a small village in the municipality of Delčevo, North Macedonia.

== Demographics ==
According to the 2002 census, the village had a total of 21 inhabitants. Ethnic groups in the village include:

- Macedonians 21
