= Abrosovo, Pskov Oblast =

Abrosovo Абросово
- Village
- Location within Pskov Oblast Location within Russia
- Coordinates: 57°51′N 28°24′E
- Country: Russia
- Region: Pskov Oblast
- District: Pskovsky District
- Time zone: UTC+3:00

Abrosovo (Russian: Абросово) is a rural locality (a village) in Pskovsky District, Pskov Oblast, Russia. The population was 10 as of 2010.

== Geography ==
Abrosovo is located 9 km northeast of Pskov (the district's administrative centre) by road. Golubovo is the nearest rural locality.
