= Dubishki =

Village in Moshenskoy District, Leningrad Oblast, Russia

Coordinates: 58°15′N 35°05′E

Dubishki (Russian: Дубишки) is a village in Moshenskoy District of Novgorod Oblast, Russia.
