= Semytino =

Village in Novgorod Oblast, Russia

Coordinates: 58°29′N 35°49′E

Semytino is a small village in Pestovsky District of Novgorod Oblast, Russia. It is located 11 km from Pestovo.
