= Abrosovo, Vladimir Oblast =

Abrosovo Абросово
- Village
- Location within Vladimir Oblast Location within Russia
- Coordinates: 56°03′N 39°15′E
- Country: Russia
- Region: Vladimir Oblast
- District: Petushinsky District
- Time zone: UTC+3:00

Abrosovo (Russian: Абросово) is a rural locality (a village) in Nagornoye Rural Settlement, Petushinsky District, Vladimir Oblast, Russia. The population was 18 as of 2010. There is 1 street.

== Geography ==
Abrosovo is located 37 km northwest of Petushki (the district's administrative centre) by road. Yefimtsevo is the nearest rural locality.
