= Star, Novgorod Oblast =

Village in Maryovsky District, Novgorod Oblast, Russia

Coordinates: 57°19′33″N 32°11′24″E

Star (Russian: Старь) is a rural locality (a village) in Maryovsky District of Novgorod Oblast, Russia.

== Sources ==
- Администрация Новгородской области. Постановление №121 от 8 апреля 2008 г. «Об реестре административно-территориального устройства области», в ред. Постановления №408 от 4 августа 2014 г. «О внесении изменений в реестр административно-территориального устройства области». Опубликован: "Новгородские ведомости", №49–50, 16 апреля 2008 г. (Administration of Novgorod Oblast. Resolution #121 of April 8, 2008 On the Registry of the Administrative-Territorial Structure of Novgorod Oblast, as amended by the Resolution #408 of August 4, 2014 On Amending the Registry of the Administrative-Territorial Structure of Novgorod Oblast. ).
