= Kosów =

Kosów may refer to:

- The Polish name for the city Kosiv in Ivano-Frankivsk oblast, Ukraine
- The Polish name for the village Kosiv in Ternopil Oblast, Ukraine
- Kosów, Łódź Voivodeship (central Poland)
- Kosów, Piaseczno County in Masovian Voivodeship (east-central Poland)
- Kosów Lacki, a town in Masovian Voivodeship, Poland (east-central Poland)
