= Kosovo, Vologda Oblast =

Rural locality in Mezhdurechensky District, Vologda Oblast, Russia

Coordinates: 59°18′N 40°43′E

Kosovo (Russian: Косово) is a rural locality (a village) in Nozemsky Selsoviet of Mezhdurechensky District in Vologda Oblast, Russia.
