= Dolgiye Borody (rural locality) =

Dolgiye Borody Долгие Бороды
- Village
- Location within Novgorod Oblast Location within Russia
- Coordinates: 58°01′32″N 33°18′35″E
- Country: Russia
- Region: Novgorod Oblast
- District: Valdaysky District
- Time zone: UTC+3:00

Dolgiye Borody (Russian: Долгие Бороды) is a rural locality (a village) in Roshchinskoye Rural Settlement of Valdaysky District, in Novgorod Oblast, Russia. The population is 124 (2010 census), although a Kommersant Vlast article of 2000 said there was only 17 residents and that the village had practically merged with the bigger neighbouring settlement of Roshchino. The presidential residence Dolgiye Borody, also known as Valdai or Uzhin, is nearby.
