= Kosova, Foča =

Kosova
- Village
- Location within Bosnia and Herzegovina
- Coordinates: 43°35′34″N 18°47′05″E
- Country: Bosnia
- Time zone: UTC+1 (CET)
  - Summer (DST): UTC+2 (CEST)

Kosova is a village in Bosnia and Herzegovina, located in municipality of Foča, in the Federation od Bosnia and Herzegovina entity.
