= Bigla =

Bigla Бигла
- Village
- Location within North Macedonia
- Coordinates: 41.957639°N 22.674845°E
- Country: North Macedonia
- Region: Eastern
- Municipality: Delčevo

Population (2002)
  - Total: 274
- Time zone: UTC+1 (CET)
  - Summer (DST): UTC+2 (CEST)

Bigla (Macedonian: Бигла) is a village in the municipality of Delčevo, North Macedonia.

== Demographics ==
As of the 2002 census, the village had a total of 274 inhabitants. Ethnic groups in the village include Macedonians and Serbs.
