= Dramče =

Dramče Драмче
- Village
- Location within North Macedonia
- Coordinates: 42.008381°N 22.715968°E
- Country: North Macedonia
- Region: Eastern
- Municipality: Delčevo

Population (2002)
  - Total: 288
- Time zone: UTC+1 (CET)
  - Summer (DST): UTC+2 (CEST)
- Website: .

Dramče (Macedonian: Драмче) is a village in the municipality of Delčevo, North Macedonia.

== Demographics ==
According to the 2002 census, the village had a total of 288 inhabitants. Ethnic groups in the village include Macedonians and Aromanians.
