= Dolgiye Borody (residence) =

Residence of the president of the Russian Federation

- Interactive map of the Dolgiye Borody area

General information
- Status: In use
- Type: Presidential residence
- Location: Dolgiye Borody, Novgorod Oblast, Russia
- Coordinates: 58°0′40″N 33°19′0″E
- Construction started: 1934
- Completed: 1939

Dolgiye Borody (Russian: Долгие Бороды or Long Beards), also known by the names "Valdai" and "Uzhin", is a residence of the president of the Russian Federation, located in the Novgorod Oblast. It is on the southern 100 hectares (250 acres) of a peninsula between Lake Uzhin and Lake Valdai, near the village of Dolgiye Borody, and 20 kilometers from the city of Valdai.

== Buildings ==
There is a neighboring rural village that is also called Dolgiye Borody. The official name of the residence is the "Uzhin" holiday home, named after the lake.

== History ==
In 1934, construction of Object 201 (as the official documents called this residence) began for Stalin. However, Stalin was only here once in 1939 as he disliked the remoteness and quietness of the surroundings. In 1940, three buildings were constructed on the shores of Lake Uzhin: "Dacha No. 1" and "Dacha No. 2" were connected to a single complex, while the building for the protection of "Dacha No. 3" is closer to the village of Dolgiye Borody. Architecturally, the dachas were similar to Stalin's dacha in Volyn.

During most of the Soviet era, the 'sanatorium' (resort) of the Central Committee of the Communist Party of the Soviet Union was located within the present boundary of the residence. In August 1948, Andrei Zhdanov died here while on vacation. His son Yuri and Stalin's daughter Svetlana Alliluyeva were married here. The residence was used for vacations by Nikita Khrushchev, Nikolai Ryzhkov and other Soviet officials. In the 1980s the residence was expanded and a 400-bed complex was built.

Boris Yeltsin, president of Russia from 1991 to 1999, liked it for the fishing and used to visit for at least two or three days twice a year. Alexander Korzhakov, Yeltsin's head of security, judged the presence of the Kosmos pioneer camp and the Azure Coast (Russian: Лазурный берег) resort next to the residence to be a security risk. A concrete wall was erected beyond those buildings in 1992, expanding the property of the residence, and the camp and resort were demolished. Vladimir Putin has been visiting the residence since 2000. The 100 hectares where the residence is located is owned by Putin's close friend Yury Kovalchuk, who leases it to the state. An adjacent 150 hectares is owned by the state and occupied by the Federal Security Service.

Currently, this residence is officially known as the Federal State Budgetary Institution of the Directorate of the President of the Russian Federation "The Holiday House Valdai", designed for 320 seats. In 2007–2010, "Dachas No. 1-3" were reconstructed in consistence with their historical appearances. The Congress Center was also built on the territory of the complex. The main building of the residence has an assembly hall.

According to Natalya Vetlitskaya, a private concert was held here in the winter of 2008 with the support of Pyotr Shaboltai, who was the director of the State Kremlin Palace.

By 2024 the complex was secured by 7 air defence systems, with the ongoing Russo-Ukrainian war it came in range of Ukrainian drones and press researchers noted that the number of Pantsir missile systems surrounding the palatial residence had increased to 27 by April 2026.
