= Abrosovo, Novgorod Oblast =

Abrosovo Абросово
- Village
- Location within Novgorod Oblast Location within Russia
- Coordinates: 58°42′N 35°26′E
- Country: Russia
- Region: Novgorod Oblast
- District: Pestovsky District
- Time zone: UTC+3:00

Abrosovo (Russian: Абросово) is a rural locality (a village) in Bogoslovskoye Rural Settlement of Pestovsky District, Novgorod Oblast, Russia. The population was 43 as of 2010.

== Geography ==
Abrosovo is located 40 km northwest of Pestovo (the district's administrative centre) by road. Zaruchevye-1 is the nearest rural locality.
