= Batetsky (rural locality) =

Batetsky Батецкий
- Settlement (of rural type)
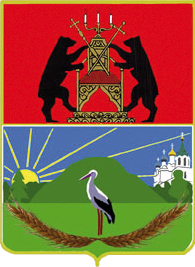
- Coat of arms
- Interactive map of Batetsky
- Location of Batetsky Batetsky (Novgorod Oblast)
- Coordinates: 58°38′24″N 30°18′36″E
- Country: Russia
- Federal subject: Novgorod Oblast
- Administrative district: Batetsky District
- SettlementSelsoviet: Batetskoye Settlement
- Founded: 1891
- Elevation: 69 m (226 ft)

Population (2010 Census)
  - Total: 2,258
  - Estimate (2010): 2,258 (0%)

Administrative status
  - Capital of: Batetsky District, Batetskoye Settlement

Municipal status
  - Municipal district: Batetsky Municipal District
  - Rural settlement: Batetskoye Rural Settlement
  - Capital of: Batetsky Municipal District, Batetskoye Rural Settlement
- Time zone: UTC+3 (MSK)
- Postal code: 175000
- OKTMO ID: 49603402101

Batetsky (Russian: Батецкий) is a rural locality (a settlement of rural type) and the administrative center of Batetsky District, Novgorod Oblast, Russia, located in the northwest of the oblast, on the banks of the Udrayka River (a right tributary of the Luga). It also serves as the administrative center of Batetskoye Settlement, one of the three settlements into which the district is administratively divided. Municipally, it is the administrative center of Batetskoye Rural Settlement in Batetsky Municipal District. Population: 2,258 (2010 census); 2,275 (2002 census); 2,473 (1989 Soviet census).

== History ==
Batetsky was founded in 1891 as a settlement serving the station on the railway between St. Petersburg and Vitebsk. It took its name from the nearby village of Batetsko, or Batetskaya. In 1916, the railway connecting Novgorod and Luga also passed through Batetsky. At the time, the station was a part of Luzhsky Uyezd of Petrograd Governorate.

On October 1, 1927, Batetsky became the administrative center of newly established Batetsky District in Luga Okrug of Leningrad Oblast. On July 23, 1930, the okrugs were abolished, and the districts were directly subordinated to the oblast. Between August, 1941 and February 12, 1944, Batetsky was occupied by German troops. On July 5, 1944, Batetsky District was transferred to newly established Novgorod Oblast. On February 1, 1963 the district was abolished in the course of Khrushchyov administrative reform. On December 30, 1966 Batetsky District was re-established.

== Economy ==
=== Industry ===
There are small-scale enterprises of timber industry and food industry.

=== Transportation ===
Batetsky is located at the crossing of two railroads: One, in the northern-southern direction, connects St. Petersburg with Velikiye Luki via Dno, and another one, approximately in the southeastern-northwestern direction, connects Veliky Novgorod with Luga.

There is a road network inside the district, connecting Batetsky, in particular, with Veliky Novgorod, Luga, Shimsk, and Soltsy.
