= Batetsky District =

Batetsky District Батецкий район (Russian)
- District
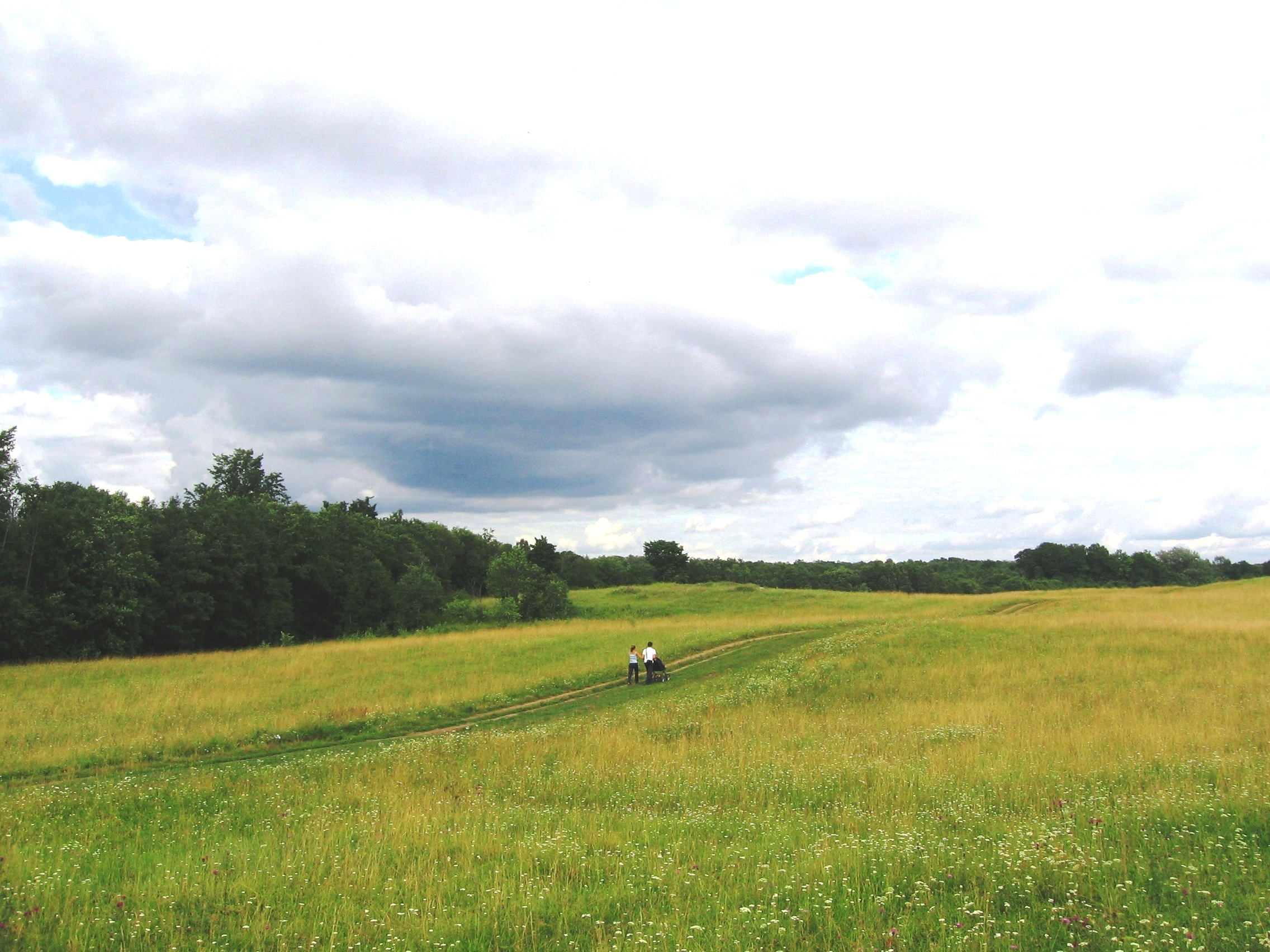
- Scene in Batetsky District

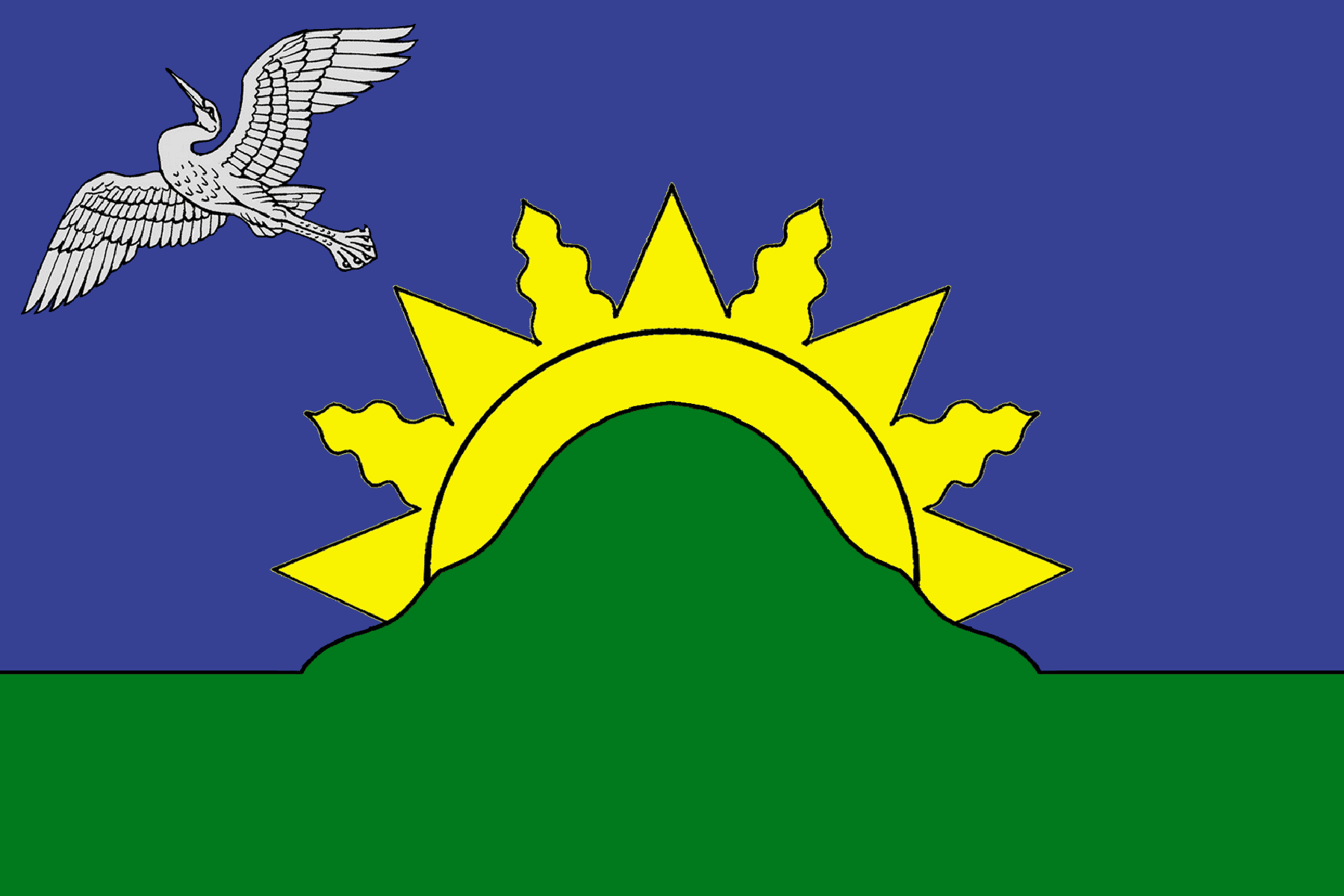
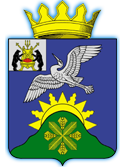
- Flag Coat of arms
- Location of Batetsky District in Novgorod Oblast
- Coordinates: 58°38′N 30°18′E
- Country: Russia
- Federal subject: Novgorod Oblast
- Established: October 1, 1927 (first), December 30, 1966 (second)
- Administrative center: Batetsky

Area
  - Total: 1,600 km^{2} (620 sq mi)

Population (2010 Census)
  - Total: 6,335
  - Density: 4.0/km^{2} (10/sq mi)
  - Urban: 0%
  - Rural: 100%

Administrative structure
  - Administrative divisions: 3 settlement
  - Inhabited localities: 145 rural localities

Municipal structure
  - Municipally incorporated as: Batetsky Municipal District
  - Municipal divisions: 0 urban settlements, 3 rural settlements
- Time zone: UTC+3 (MSK)
- OKTMO ID: 49603000
- Website: http://batetsky.ru/

Batetsky District (Russian: Батецкий район) is an administrative and municipal district (raion), one of the twenty-one in Novgorod Oblast, Russia. It is located in the northwest of the oblast and borders with Luzhsky District of Leningrad Oblast in the northwest, Novgorodsky District in the east, and with Shimsky District in the south. The area of the district is 1,600 square kilometers (620 sq mi). Its administrative center is the rural locality (a settlement) of Batetsky. District's population: 6,335 (2010 census); 6,996 (2002 Census); 7,622 (1989 Soviet census). The population of the administrative center accounts for 35.6% of the district's total population.

== Geography ==
The main river flowing through the district is the Luga, and much of the east, center, and west of the district lies in its basin. The southwest of the district is in the basin of the Shelon River, whereas the southeast is in the basin of the Verenda, a tributary of Lake Ilmen, and of the left tributaries of the Volkhov River. The landscape of the district is flat and swampy.

== History ==
The settlement of Batetsky was founded in 1891 to serve as a station on the railway between St. Petersburg and Vitebsk. At the time, the area was split between Luzhsky Uyezd of Saint Petersburg Governorate and Novgorodsky Uyezd of Novgorod Governorate.

In August 1927, the governorates and uyezds were abolished. Batetsky District, with the administrative center in the settlement of Batetsky, was established within Luga Okrug of Leningrad Oblast effective October 1, 1927. It included parts of former Luzhsky and Novgorodsky Uyezds. On July 23, 1930, the okrugs were abolished, and the districts were directly subordinated to the oblast. Between August 1941 and February 1944, Batetsky District was occupied by German troops. On July 5, 1944, Batetsky District was transferred to newly established Novgorod Oblast. On February 1, 1963, the district was abolished in the course of the Nikita Khrushchev's administrative reform. On December 30, 1966, Batetsky District was re-established.

Effective October 1, 1927, Chyornovsky District with the administrative center in the selo of Chyornoye was also established, as part of Novgorod Okrug of Leningrad Oblast. It included parts of Novgorodsky Uyezd. On September 20, 1931, Chyornovsky District was abolished and merged into Batetsky District.

== Economy ==
=== Industry ===
The district specializes in timber industry and food industry.

=== Agriculture ===
There are four large-scale farms in the district. The main agricultural specialization is milk production. Agricultural lands occupy 229 square kilometers (88 sq mi) and are mainly used to grow crops.

=== Transportation ===
Batetsky District is located at the crossing of two railroads: one, in the northern-southern direction, connects St. Petersburg with Velikiye Luki via Dno, and another one, approximately in the southeastern-northwestern direction, connects Veliky Novgorod with Luga.

A road network within the district connects it, among other places, with Veliky Novgorod, Luga, Shimsk, and Soltsy.

== Culture and recreation ==
The district contains 12 cultural heritage monuments of federal significance and additionally 129 objects classified as cultural and historical heritage of local significance. The federal monuments are the complex of the Muravyov Estate in the village of Tereboni, and a number of archeological sites.

A creation of an open-air archaeological museum is planned. The museum will include a complex of tumuli, the highest of which is known as Shum-gora, and will be devoted to Viking culture.
