= List of schools of international relations =

Schools of international relations around the world

This is a list of schools with dedicated or teaching programs in diplomacy

== Africa ==
=== Cameroon ===
- University of Yaoundé: International Relations Institute of Cameroon located in Yaoundé
- University of Yaounde 2 : International relations and strategic studies

=== Egypt ===
- Cairo University: Faculty of Economics and Political Science located in Giza
- Mansoura University: located in Mansoura
- American University in Cairo: Political Science Department and the School of Global Affairs and Public Policy located in Cairo
- Helwan University: Faculty of Commerce and Business Administration Department of International Relations located in Cairo
- Pharos University in Alexandria: Faculty of Legal Studies and International Relations ions located in Alexandria
- British University in Cairo: Political Science Department located in Cairo
- Future University: Political Science Department located in Cairo

=== Ghana ===
- Consular & Diplomatic Service University (CDSU)
- Ridgeway School of Diplomacy: located in Accra Ghana.
- University of Ghana: Legon Center for International Affairs and Diplomacy located in Accra

=== Kenya ===
- United States International University: school of humanities and social sciences, Bachelor of Arts in international relations
- University of Nairobi: Institute of Diplomacy and International Studies located in Nairobi
- Maseno University: School of Development and Strategic Studies, Bachelor of Arts in International Relations and Diplomacy, with IT located in Kisumu

=== Liberia ===
- University of Liberia: Ibrahim B. Babangida Graduate School of International Relations located in Monrovia

=== Morocco ===
- Al Akhawayn University: School of Humanities and Social Sciences located in Ifrane

=== Mozambique ===
- Higher Institute of International Relations: Located in Maputo, www.isri.co.mz

=== Nigeria ===
- University of Ibadan: Department of Political Science located in Ibadan, Nigeria
- Landmark University: Department of Political Science and International Relations located in Omu-Aran, Nigeria
- Landmark University: Department of Political Science and International Relations located in Ota, Nigeria

=== South Africa ===
- Rhodes University: Faculty of Humanities located in Grahamstown
- Stellenbosch University: Faculty of Arts and Social Sciences located in Stellenbosch
- University of Cape Town: Faculty of Humanities located in Cape Town
- University of KwaZulu-Natal: School of Politics located in Pietermaritzburg
- University of Pretoria: Faculty of Humanities located in Pretoria
- University of the Witwatersrand: School of Social Sciences located in Johannesburg

=== Sudan ===
- University of Khartoum: Faculty of Economic and Social Studies located in Khartoum

== Asia ==
=== Bangladesh ===
- Bangladesh University of Professionals, Dhaka
- Gopalganj Science and Technology University, Gopalganj
- Jahangirnagar University, Dhaka
- University of Chittagong, Chattogram
- University of Dhaka, Dhaka (the first Department of International Relations in South Asia)
- University of Rajshahi, Rajshahi

=== China ===
- China Foreign Affairs University (formerly Foreign Affairs College)
- City University of Hong Kong
- Fudan University - School of International and Public Affairs
- Hopkins-Nanjing Center
- Peking University - Department of International Relations
- Renmin University - Department of International Relations
- Shanghai International Studies University
- Tsinghua University - Department of International Relations
- University of International Relations
- Guangdong University of Foreign Studies
- Beijing International Studies University
- Sichuan International Studies University
- Xi'an International Studies University
- Dalian University of Foreign Languages

=== Nepal ===
- Tribhuvan University, Master's Programme in International Relations and Diplomacy (MIRD)
- Mid-Western University

=== India ===
- Symbiosis School of International Studies, (Symbiosis International University) Pune
- Jamia Millia Islamia, MMAJ Academy of International Studies
- Aligarh Muslim University, Faculty of International Studies
- Annamalai University, Tamil Nadu
- Central University of Gujarat
- Central University of South Bihar
- Central University of Jharkhand Center For International Relations
- Central University of Punjab
- ukreplicawatch.is
- Centre for International Relations, Islamic University of Science and Technology, Jammu and Kashmir.
- Jadavpur University
- Jawaharlal Nehru University, School of International Studies
- Jindal School of International Affairs, National Capital Region of Delhi
- Mahatma Gandhi University
- Manipal University
- Pondicherry University
- School of Global Studies, Department of International Relations, Central University of Kerala, Kasargod
- School of Liberal Studies, Pandit Deendayal Petroleum University
- Sikkim University (central university), Sikkim
- South Asian University, New Delhi
- Stella Maris College, Chennai, Tamil Nadu
- Symbiosis School for Liberal Arts, (Symbiosis International University) Pune
- University of Madras, School of Politics and International Studies
- Christ University Bengaluru, M.A. International Studies
- M.A. in International Relations, Maharaja's College, Mysore
- University of Rajasthan - Main Website
- S.S. Jain Subodh P.G. (Autonomous) College Jaipur

=== Indonesia ===
- Airlangga University, Faculty of Politics and Social Science Studies
- Andalas University, Faculty of Politics and Social Science Studies
- Bakrie university, Faculty of Economics and Social Sciences
- Bina Nusantara University, Faculty of Humanities
- Brawijaya University, Faculty of Social and Politics
- Diponegoro University, Faculty of Political and Social Sciences
- Gadjah Mada University, Faculty of Political and Social Science Studies
- Hasanuddin University, Faculty of social sciences
- Jenderal Ahmad Yani University, Faculty of Politics and Social Sciences
- Jenderal Soedirman University, Faculty of Politics and Social Science Studies
- Muhammadiyah University of Yogyakarta, Faculty of Political and Social Science Studies
- Mulawarman University, Faculty of politics and social science studies
- National Development University "Veteran" Yogyakarta, Faculty of Social and Political Sciences
- Padjajaran University, Faculty of Politics and Social Science
- Parahyangan Catholic University, Faculty of Politics and Social Science Studies
- Paramadina University, Faculty of Philosophy and Civilization
- Pasundan University, Faculty of Politics and Social Science Studies
- Pelita Harapan University, Faculty of Social and Political Sciences Studies
- Pertamina University, Faculty of Communication and Diplomacy
- President University, Faculty of Business Administration and International Relations
- Respati University of Yogyakarta, Faculty of Social Sciences and Economics
- State Islamic University, Syarif Hidayatullah, Faculty of Social and Political Sciences
- University of Indonesia, Faculty of Politics and Social Science Studies
- University of Jember, Faculty of Political and Social Science Studies
- Udayana University, Faculty of Social and Political Sciences

=== Japan ===
- Asia University
- International Christian University
- International University of Japan
- National Graduate Institute for Policy Studies
- Nihon University
- Ritsumeikan University
- University of Tsukuba

=== Malaysia ===
- International Islamic University Malaysia, PhD in Political Science
- National University of Malaysia, Institute for Malaysian and International Studies
- National University of Malaysia, School of History, Politics and Strategic Studies
- University of Malaya, Department of International and Strategyc Studies
- Universiti Malaysia Sabah, School of Social Science
- Universiti Utara Malaysia, Kedah, School of International Studies
- Monash University Malaysia, School of Arts and Social Sciences

=== Pakistan ===
- Department of International Relations, Bahria University, Islamabad
- Institute of Business Management Karachi School of International Relations
- International Islamic University, Islamabad Department of International Relations
- Iqra University
- Kinnaird College Department of International Relations
- Lahore College for Women University, Lahore Department of International Relations
- National Defence University, Islamabad Department of International Relations, Faculty of Contemporary Studies
- National University of Modern Languages Department of International relations
- Preston University Islamabad
- Quaid-i-Azam University, Islamabad, School of Politics and International Relations
- University of Karachi Department of International Relations and Political Science
- University of Peshawar Department of International relations

=== Philippines ===
- Ateneo de Davao University
- Ateneo School of Social Sciences and Ateneo School of Government
- Cavite State University
- Centro Escolar University
- College of the Holy Spirit
- De La Salle – College of Saint Benilde – School of Multidisciplinary Studies
- De La Salle University College of Liberal Arts
- Far Eastern University
- Liceo de Cagayan University
- Lyceum of the Philippines University – College of International Relations (AB Foreign Service major in Diplomacy/International Trade)
- Manuel L. Quezon University
- Mindanao State University – Main Campus, Marawi City
- Miriam College
- New Era University
- Philippine Women's University
- RC Al-Khwarizmi International College – College of Diplomacy and International Relations, Marawi City
- University of Asia and the Pacific-Political Economy Program with Specialization in International Relations and Development
- University of Manila – Department of Foreign Service
- University of St. La Salle
- University of San Agustin
- University of San Jose – Recoletos
- University of Santo Tomas Faculty of Arts and Letters
- University of Southern Mindanao
- University of the East – College of Arts and Science
- University of the Philippines College of Social Sciences and Philosophy
- Xavier University – Ateneo de Cagayan

=== Singapore ===
- Lee Kuan Yew School of Public Policy, National University of Singapore
- S. Rajaratnam School of International Studies, Nanyang Technological University

=== South Korea ===
- Ewha Womans University
- Hankuk University of Foreign Studies
- Korea University
- Kyunghee University

- Sogang University
- Yonsei University

=== Sri Lanka ===
- Bandaranaike International Diplomatic Training Institute
- Lakshman Kadirgamar Institute of International Relations and Strategic Studies

=== Taiwan ===
- Department of Political Science, National Taiwan University (國立臺灣大學)
- College of International Affairs, National Chengchi University (國立政治大學)
- Institute of Political Science, National Sun Yat-sen University (國立中山大學)
- Graduate Institute of International Politics, National Chung Hsing University (國立中興大學)
- Institute of Strategy and International Affairs, National Chung Cheng University (國立中正大學)
- Graduate School of International Affairs, Ming Chuan University (銘傳大學)
- Graduate Institute of International Affairs and Strategic Studies, Tamkang University (淡江大學)

=== Tajikistan ===
- Tajik National University
- Russian-Tajik Slavonic University
- Lomonosov Moscow State University branch
- University of Central Asia
- Tajikistan Humanitarian International University
- Technological University of Tajikistan

=== Thailand ===
- Mahidol University (Department of International Relations and Global Affairs)
- College of Politics and Governance, Mahasarakham University (The Department of International Relations)
- Faculty of Political Science, Chulalongkorn University (The Department of International Relations)
- International College, Khonkaen University (The Department of International Relations)
- Faculty of Political Science, Ramkhamheang University (The Department of International Relations)
- Faculty of Political Science, Thammasat University (The Department of International Relations)
- Kasetsart University
- Srinakharinwirot University

=== Turkmenistan ===
- Institute of International Relations
- International University of Humanities and Development

=== Vietnam ===
- Diplomatic Academy of Vietnam
- University of Social Sciences and Humanities - Vietnam National University
- Hanoi University
- Ho Chi Minh City University of Foreign Languages and Information Technology (HUFLIT)
- Ho Chi Minh City University of Social Sciences and Humanities
- University of Economy and Finance- UEF

== Europe ==
=== Austria ===
- Diplomatic Academy of Vienna (DA)

=== Belgium ===
- College of Europe, Bruges
- Saint-Louis University, Brussels, Brussels
- UCLouvain, Louvain-la-Neuve
- UCLouvain FUCaM Mons, Mons
- University of Liège, Liège
- University of Antwerp, Antwerp
- Vesalius College, Brussels
- KU Leuven, Leuven

=== Belarus ===
- Belarusian State University, Minsk

=== Bosnia and Herzegovina ===
- Faculty of Political Science, University of Sarajevo
- Faculty of Arts and Social Sciences, International University of Sarajevo
- Faculty of Political Science, University of Banja Luka

=== Bulgaria ===
- Sofia University, Sofia
- University of National and World Economy, Sofia
- South-West University "Neofit Rilski", Blagoevgrad

=== Croatia ===
- Dubrovnik International University, Dubrovnik,
- University College of International Relations and Diplomacy Dag Hammarskjöld, Zagreb,

=== Czech Republic ===
- Charles University, Prague
- Masaryk University, Brno
- Metropolitan University Prague
- Palacky University, Olomouc
- University of Economics, Prague

=== Denmark ===
- Aarhus University

=== Estonia ===
- Tallinn University
- Tallinn University of Technology
- University of Tartu

=== France ===
- American Graduate School in Paris (AGS), Paris
- Centre d'Etudes Diplomatiques et Stratégiques (CEDS), Paris
- Écoles des Hautes Études Internationales et Politiques,(HEI-HEP) Paris
- École Nationale d'Administration (ÉNA), Strasbourg
- Institut de relations internationales et stratégiques, (IRIS) Paris.
- Institut libre d'étude des relations internationales,(ILERI), Paris
- Institute of Higher International Studies, Paris
- Sciences Po Paris (formally known as Institut d'Études Politiques de Paris), Paris, and in particular its specific department, the Paris School of International Affairs
- Institut d'Etudes Politiques de Lyon (Sciences Po Lyon)
- Sciences Po Strasbourg
- Sciences Po Lille
- Sciences Po Grenoble
- Université Lyon 3
- Schiller International University (SIU), Paris
- The American University of Paris (AUP), Paris

=== Germany ===
- Hochschule Rhein-Waal, Cleves
- Ostbayerische Technische Hochschule Regensburg (OTH), Regensburg
- School of International Studies of the Dresden University of Technology
- Schiller International University (SIU), Heidelberg
- Universität Erfurt, Erfurt
- Zeppelin University, Friedrichshafen

=== Hungary ===
- Andrássy Gyula German Language University of Budapest, Budapest
- Central European University (CEU), Budapest
- Corvinus University of Budapest, Budapest
- Eötvös Loránd University, Budapest
- University of Szeged, Szeged

=== Italy ===
- Bologna Center of the Johns Hopkins University Paul H. Nitze School of Advanced International Studies (SAIS)
- Ca' Foscari University of Venice – School of International Relations
- European University Institute (EUI), Florence
- Institute for International Political Studies (ISPI), Milan
- Italian Society for International Organizations (SIOI), Rome
- Luiss School of Government, Rome
- NATO Defense College (NDC), Rome
- St. John's University MA in Government and Politics - International Affairs, Rome
- United Nations System Staff College (UNSSC), Turin
- University of Bologna – School of Political Science "R. Ruffilli", Forlì Campus
- University of Florence – School of Political Science "Cesare Alfieri"
- University of Milan – School of Political Science
- University of Padua – School of Political Science
- University of Pavia – School of Political Science
- University of Salento – Faculty of Education, Political and Social sciences
- University of Trieste – School of International and Diplomatic Studies (SID), Gorizia Campus
- University of Trento – School of International Studies

=== Lithuania ===
- Vilnius University Institute of International Relations and Political Science (TSPMI), Vilnius
- Vytautas Magnus University Faculty of Political Science and Diplomacy (PMDF), Kaunas

=== The Netherlands ===
- University of Groningen, Groningen
- University of Leiden, Leiden
- Netherlands Institute of International Relations Clingendael, The Hague

=== Poland ===
- College of Europe, Natolin Campus
- Collegium Civitas
- Maria Curie-Skłodowska University
- Jagiellonian University
- University of Warsaw
- University of Wrocław
- Lazarski University

=== Portugal ===
- Catholic University of Portugal, Lisbon

- Institute of Political Studies

- University of Coimbra, Coimbra

- Faculty of Economics

- University of Évora, Évora

- School of Social Sciences

- University of Lisbon, Lisbon

- School of Social and Political Sciences

- University of Porto, Porto

- Faculty of Arts and Humanities

- New University of Lisbon, Lisbon

- Faculty of Social and Human Sciences

- University of Minho, Braga
- University of Beira Interior, Covilhã
- Autonomous University of Lisbon, Lisbon
- Lusíada University, Lisbon
- Lusíada University of Porto, Porto
- Lusophone University of Humanities and Technologies, Lisbon
- Portucalense University Infante D. Henrique, Porto
- Fernando Pessoa University, Porto

=== Russia ===
- Diplomatic Academy of the Ministry of Foreign Affairs of the Russian Federation
- Far Eastern Federal University
- Moscow State Institute of International Relations
- Moscow State Linguistic University
- N. I. Lobachevsky State University of Nizhny Novgorod
- People's Friendship University of Russia
- Saint Petersburg State University, School of International Relations
- Tomsk State University, Department of International Relations

=== Serbia ===
- Academy of Diplomacy and Security, Belgrade
- University of Belgrade, Faculty of Political Sciences located in Belgrade

=== Slovakia ===
- Faculty of International Relations, University of Economics in Bratislava, Bratislava
- Matej Bel School of Political Sciences and International Relations, Banská Bystrica

=== Slovenia ===
- Faculty of Social Sciences: Ljubljana

=== Spain ===
- Diplomatic School of Spain, Madrid
- IE School of International Relations, Madrid
- Institut Barcelona d'Estudis Internacionals, Barcelona
- Schiller International University (SIU), Madrid
- Universidad de Navarra, Pamplona
- Universidad Rey Juan Carlos, Madrid
- Universidad Europea, Madrid & Valencia
- Universidad Loyola de Andalucía, Andalucía
- Universidad de Deusto, Bilbao & San Sebastián

=== Switzerland ===
- Graduate Institute of International and Development Studies (IHEID), Geneva
- University of Geneva
- University of St. Gallen
- Webster University Geneva

=== Turkiye ===
- Ankara University
- Bilkent University
- Galatasaray University
- Istanbul Bilgi University
- Koç University
- Middle East Technical University: Department of International Relations located in Ankara
- Özyeğin University

=== United Kingdom ===
- Aberystwyth University
- Durham University, School of Government and International Affairs
- Exeter University
- Goldsmiths, University of London
- Keele University
- Lancaster University
- London School of Economics and Political Science
- Loughborough University
- Nottingham Trent University
- Oxford University
- Richmond, The American International University in London
- Royal Holloway College
- Schiller International University (SIU), London
- School of Oriental and African Studies (SOAS)
- Swansea University
- University of Aberdeen
- University of Birmingham
- University of Bristol
- University of Cambridge
- University of Edinburgh
- University of Derby
- University of East Anglia
- University of Essex
- University of Kent
- University of Leeds
- University of Leicester
- University of London
- University of Manchester
- University of Northampton
- University of Plymouth
- University of Portsmouth
- University of St. Andrews
- University of Sussex
- University of York
- University of Warwick
- University of Westminster
- Nottingham Trent University
- London Metropolitan University
- Oxford Brookes University

== Americas ==
=== Argentina ===
- Pontificia Universidad Católica Argentina located in Buenos Aires
- Universidad Nacional de San Martín located in San Martín, Buenos Aires
- Universidad del Salvador located in Buenos Aires

=== Brazil ===
==== Bahia ====
- Universidade Salvador (UNIFACS) in Salvador

==== Distrito Federal ====
- Institute of International Relations at University of Brasília in Brasília
- Rio Branco Institute (IRBr) in Brasília
- Uniprojeção Brasilia
- Universidade Católica de Brasília (UCB) in Brasília

==== Goiás ====
- Pontifícia Universidade Católica de Goiás (PUC-Goiás) in Goiânia

==== Mato Grosso do Sul ====
- Universidade Federal da Grande Dourados (UFGD) in Dourados

==== Minas Gerais ====
- Pontifícia Universidade Católica de Minas Gerais (PUC-MG) in Belo Horizonte
- Universidade Federal de Uberlândia (UFU) in Uberlândia

==== Paraíba ====
- Centro de Ciências Biológicas e Sociais Applicadas (CCBSA) at State University of Paraíba (UEPB) in João Pessoa
- Federal University of Paraíba (UFPB) in João Pessoa

==== Pernambuco ====
- Faculdade Damas da Instrução Cristã (FADIC) in Recife

==== Rio de Janeiro ====
- Instituto Brasileiro de Mercado de Capitais (Ibmec) in Rio de Janeiro
- Universidade Cândido Mendes (UCAM) in Rio de Janeiro
- Universidade Estácio de Sá (Estácio, S.A.) in Rio de Janeiro
- Centro Federal de Educação Tecnológica (CEFET-RJ) in Rio de Janeiro
- Centro Universitário IBMR (IBMR) in Rio de Janeiro
- Pontifícia Universidade Católica do Rio de Janeiro (PUC-Rio) in Rio de Janeiro
- Universidade Federal Rural do Rio de Janeiro (UFRRJ) in Seropédica
- Universidade Federal do Rio de Janeiro (UFRJ) in Rio de Janeiro
- Universidade do Estado do Rio de Janeiro (UERJ) in Rio de Janeiro

==== Rio Grande do Sul ====
- Núcleo PRISMA - International Relations Research Center at Universidade Federal de Santa Maria (UFSM) in Santa Maria
- Mercosur's Integration Center at Universidade Federal de Pelotas (UFPEL) in Pelotas
- Universidade Federal do Rio Grande do Sul in Porto Alegre
- Universidade La Salle (Unilasalle) in Canoas
- Universidade Federal do Rio Grande (FURG) in Santa Vitória do Palmar

==== Roraima ====
- Universidade Federal de Roraima (UFRR) in Boa Vista

==== Santa Catarina ====
- Universidade do Sul de Santa Catarina (UNISUL) in Florianópolis
- Centro Universitário Curitiba (UniCuritiba) in Curitiba
- Universidade Federal de Santa Catarina (UFSC) in Florianópolis
- Universidade do Vale do Itajaí (UNIVALI) in Itajaí

==== São Paulo ====
- Centro Universitário Senac in São Paulo
- Universidade Federal do ABC (UFABC) in Santo André
- Fundação Armando Alvares Penteado (FAAP) in São Paulo
- Fundação Escola de Comércio Álvares Penteado (FECAP) in São Paulo
- Universidade Estadual Paulista (UNESP) in Franca and Marília
- Institute of International Relations and Group of International Conjuncture Analysis at University of São Paulo (USP) in São Paulo
- Pontifícia Universidade Católica de São Paulo (PUC-SP) in São Paulo
- Faculdades Metropolitanas Unidas (FMU) in São Paulo
- Escola Superior de Propaganda e Marketing (ESPM) in São Paulo
- Faculdades Integradas Rio Branco in São Paulo
- Escola Paulista de Política, Economia e Negócios at Universidade Federal de São Paulo (UNIFESP) in Osasco
- Centro de Relações Internacionais at Faculdades Campinas (FACAMP) in Campinas

==== Sergipe ====
- Universidade Federal de Sergipe (UFS) in Aracaju

=== Canada ===
==== Alberta ====
- Department of Political Science - University of Calgary: BA in International Relations

==== British Columbia ====
- Department of International Studies - University of Northern British Columbia: BA in International Studies; MA in International Studies
- Liu Institute for Global Issues - University of British Columbia: BA in International Relations
- UBC Graduate School - University of British Columbia: Master's of Public Policy and Global Affairs:
- School of International Studies - Simon Fraser University: BA in International Studies; MA in International Studies

==== Ontario ====
- Balsillie School of International Affairs - University of Waterloo & Wilfrid Laurier University: MA in Global Governance; MA in International Public Policy; Ph.D. in Global Governance
- Glendon School of Public and International Affairs - Glendon College (autonomous college of York University): MA in Public International Affairs
- Graduate School of Public and International Affairs - University of Ottawa: BSocSc in Conflict Studies and Human Rights; MA in Public and International Affairs
- Department of Political Science - McMaster University: MA in International Relations; Ph.D. in International Relations
- Munk School of Global Affairs and Public Policy - University of Toronto: BA in International Relations; MA in Global Affairs
- Norman Paterson School of International Affairs - Carleton University: MA in International Affairs; Ph.D. in International Affairs
- Department of History & Department of Political Science - University of Western Ontario: BA in International Relations
- Department of Political Science - University of Windsor: BA in International Relations and Development Studies

==== Québec ====
- Institute for Advanced International Studies - Université Laval: MA in International Studies; Ph.D. in International Studies
- Centre for International Studies (CÉRIUM) - Université de Montréal: BA in International Studies;
- The Montreal Institute of International Studies - Université du Québec à Montréal: BA in International Relations and International Law

==== Saskatchewan ====
- Department of Political Science and the International Studies - University of Regina: BA in International Studies

=== Colombia ===
- Universidad Jorge Tadeo Lozano (Faculty of International Relations) Located in Bogotá.
- Universidad Externado de Colombia Government and International Relations faculty in Colombia. Located in Bogotá, Colombia.
- Universidad Externado de Colombia (Faculty of Finance, Public Affairs and International Relations) located in Bogotá
- Pontificia Universidad Javeriana (Faculty of Social Sciences, International Relations) located in Bogotá
- Universidad del Rosario (Faculty of International Relations) Located in Bogotá
- Universidad Militar Nueva Granada (Faculty of Internacional Relations and Political Studies) located in Bogotá.

=== Costa Rica ===
- United Nations University for Peace
- Universidad Nacional, School for International Relations

=== Mexico ===
==== Oaxaca ====
- Institute of International Relations Isidro Fabela at Universidad del Mar

==== Mexico City ====
- Centre of International Studies at El Colegio de México
- Department of International Studies at Monterrey Institute of Technology and Higher Education, Campus Ciudad de México
- Bachelor in International Relations at Universidad del Valle de Mexico
- Department of International Relations at Universidad Iberoamericana
- Bachelor in International Relations at Centro de Investigación y Docencia Económicas
- School of International Relations at Universidad Anáhuac del Norte
- International Relations Centre, at Political and Social Sciences School (CRI-FCPyS) at National Autonomous University of Mexico
- Department of International Studies Instituto Tecnológico Autónomo de México

==== Jalisco ====
- Department of International Studies (Centro Universitario de Ciencias Sociales y Humanidades) at University of Guadalajara located in Guadalajara
- Department of Asia-Pacific Studies (Centro Universitario de Ciencias Sociales y Humanidades) at University of Guadalajara located in Guadalajara
- Department of Latin American Studies (Centro Universitario de Ciencias Sociales y Humanidades) at University of Guadalajara located in Guadalajara
- Division of Social Sciences and Humanities at Monterrey Institute of Technology and Higher Education, Campus Guadalajara
- Bachelor in International Relations at Western Institute of Technology and Higher Education
- Bachelor in International Relations at Universidad Autónoma de Guadalajara
- Bachelor in International Relations at Universidad del Valle de Mexico

==== Nuevo León ====
- Department of International Relations and Political Science at Monterrey Institute of Technology and Higher Education, Campus Monterrey
- Faculty of Political Science and Public Administration at Universidad Autónoma de Nuevo León

==== Puebla ====
- Department of International Relations and Political Science (DRICP) at Universidad de las Américas Puebla
- Faculty of Law and Social Sciences at Autonomous University of Puebla

=== Panamá ===
- Universidad de Panamá located in Panama City

=== Perú ===
- Pontificia Universidad Católica del Perú located in Lima
- Academia Diplomática del Perú located in Lima
- Universidad San Ignacio de Loyola located in Lima

=== Uruguay ===
- Universidad de la Republica

=== Venezuela ===
- Universidad Central de Venezuela, School of International Studies located in Caracas
- Universidad Santa María:, School of International Studies located in Caracas

== Middle East ==
=== Iran ===
- School of International Relations

=== Iraq ===
- American University of Iraq located in Sulaymaniyah
- University of Baghdad: College of Political Sciences located in Baghdad
- University of Mosul: College of Political Sciences located in Mosul

=== Israel ===
- Jerusalem Faculty of Political Science
- Haifa Diplomatic University

=== Jordan ===
- University of Jordan: Faculty of International Studies located in Amman

=== Kuwait ===
- American University of Kuwait located in Kuwait City

=== Lebanon ===
- Lebanese American University: School of Arts and Sciences located in Beirut and Byblos
- Notre Dame University - Louaize: Faculty of Political Science, Public Administration & Diplomacy located in Zouk Mosbeh
- University of Balamand: Faculty of Arts and Social Sciences located in El-Koura

=== Palestine ===
- Al-Quds University: The Al Quds Bard Honors College located in Jerusalem

=== Qatar ===
- Qatar University: College of Arts and Sciences located in Doha
- Georgetown University School of Foreign Service in Qatar located in Doha

=== Syria ===
- University of Kalamoon: Faculty of Diplomatic Sciences and International Relations located in Damascus

=== United Arab Emirates ===
- American University of Sharjah: College of Arts and Sciences located in Sharjah
- Paris-Sorbonne University Abu Dhabi located in Abu Dhabi
- Zayed University: College of Arts and Sciences located in Abu Dhabi and Dubai
- University of Sharjah: College of Arts, Humanities and Social Sciences.

American University Of Dubai

== Oceania ==
=== Australia ===
==== Australian Capital Territory ====
- Australian National University: School of Politics and International Relations located in Canberra
- Australian National University: Asia-Pacific School of Diplomacy located in Canberra
- Australian National University: ANU College of Asia and the Pacific located in Canberra
- Australian National University: ANU Centre for Arab and Islamic Studies located in Canberra

==== New South Wales ====
- Macquarie University: Macquarie University Faculty of Arts located in Sydney
- University of New South Wales: School of Social Sciences and International Studies located in Sydney
- University of Sydney: School of Social and Political Sciences located in Sydney

==== Queensland ====
- University of Queensland: Faculty of Social and Behavioural Sciences located in Brisbane

==== Tasmania ====
- University of Tasmania: School of Government located in Hobart

==== Victoria ====
- La Trobe University: School of Social Sciences located in Melbourne
- Monash University: Monash University Faculty of Arts located in Melbourne
- RMIT University: School of Global, Urban and Social Studies located in Melbourne
- University of Melbourne: School of Social and Political Sciences located in Melbourne

==== South Australia ====
- University of Adelaide: Faculty of Humanities & Social Science located in Adelaide

==== Western Australia ====
- University of Western Australia: School of Social and Cultural Studies located in Perth

=== New Zealand ===
- University of Auckland: University of Auckland Faculty of Arts located in Auckland
- University of Canterbury: School of Social and Political Sciences located in Christchurch
- Victoria University of Wellington, located in the country's capital, Wellington

== See also ==
- Association of Professional Schools of International Affairs
