= FMV =

FMV may refer to:

== Science and technology ==
- Full-motion video, a video game narration technique that relies upon pre-recorded video files
- Fig mosaic virus (Fig mosaic emaravirus), a segmented, negative sense, single-stranded RNA virus
- Function multi-versioning, an optimization technique in computing

== Other uses ==
- FMV (catamaran), a vessel that was sailed across the Atlantic Ocean in 1981
- Swedish Defence Materiel Administration (Swedish: Försvarets materielverk), Sweden
- Faculty of International Relations, University of Economics in Bratislava, faculty of the University of Economics in Bratislava
- Fair market value, an estimate of the market value of a property
