= Blagoevgrad =

Blagoevgrad Благоевград (Bulgarian)
- Town
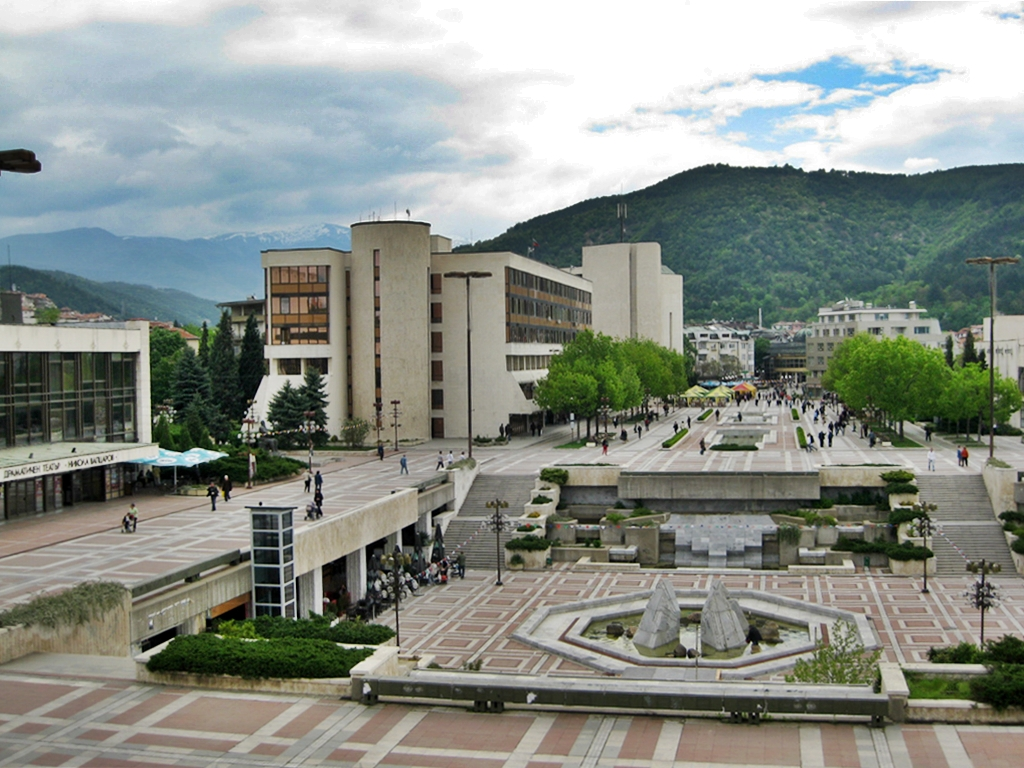
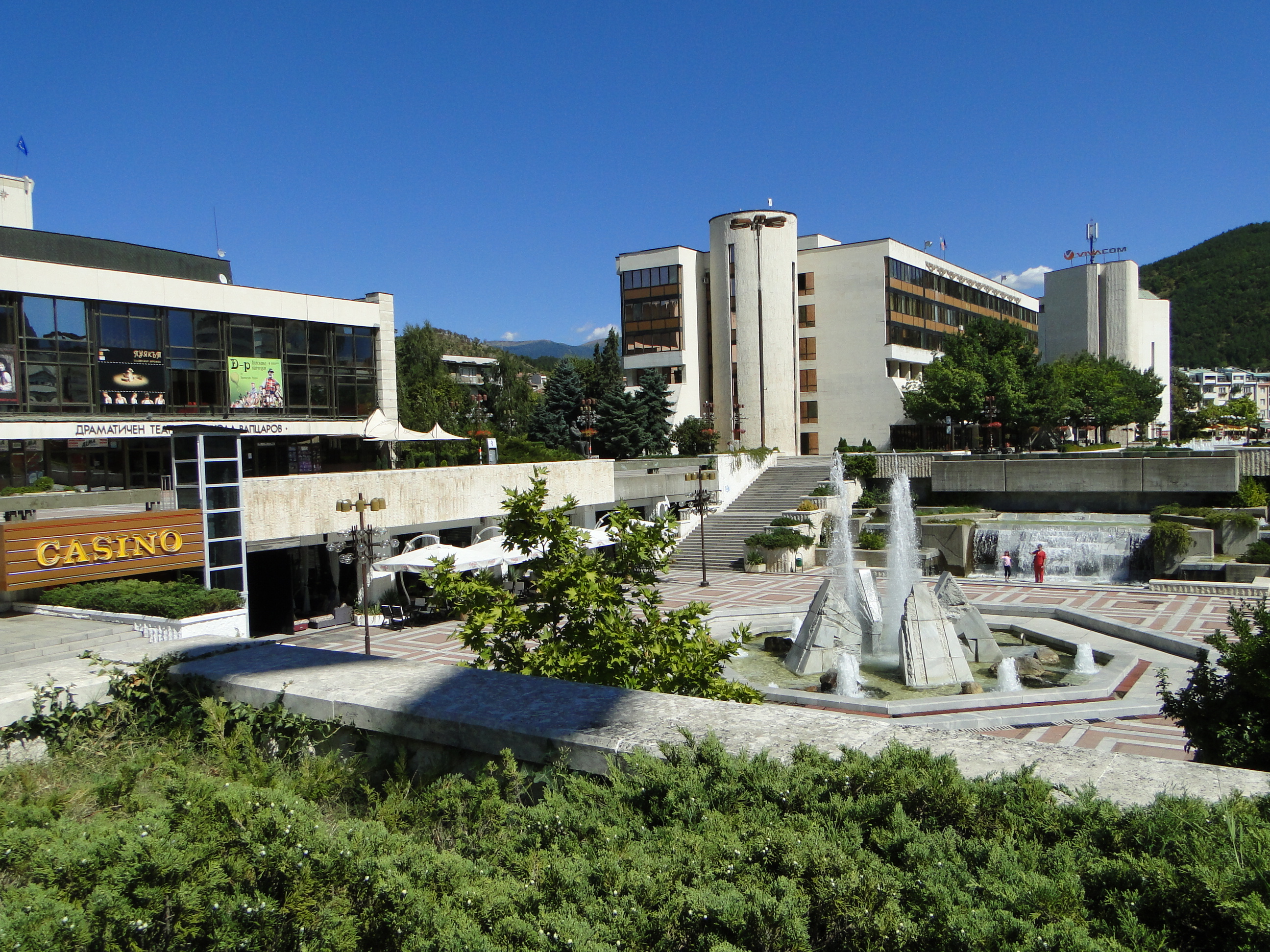
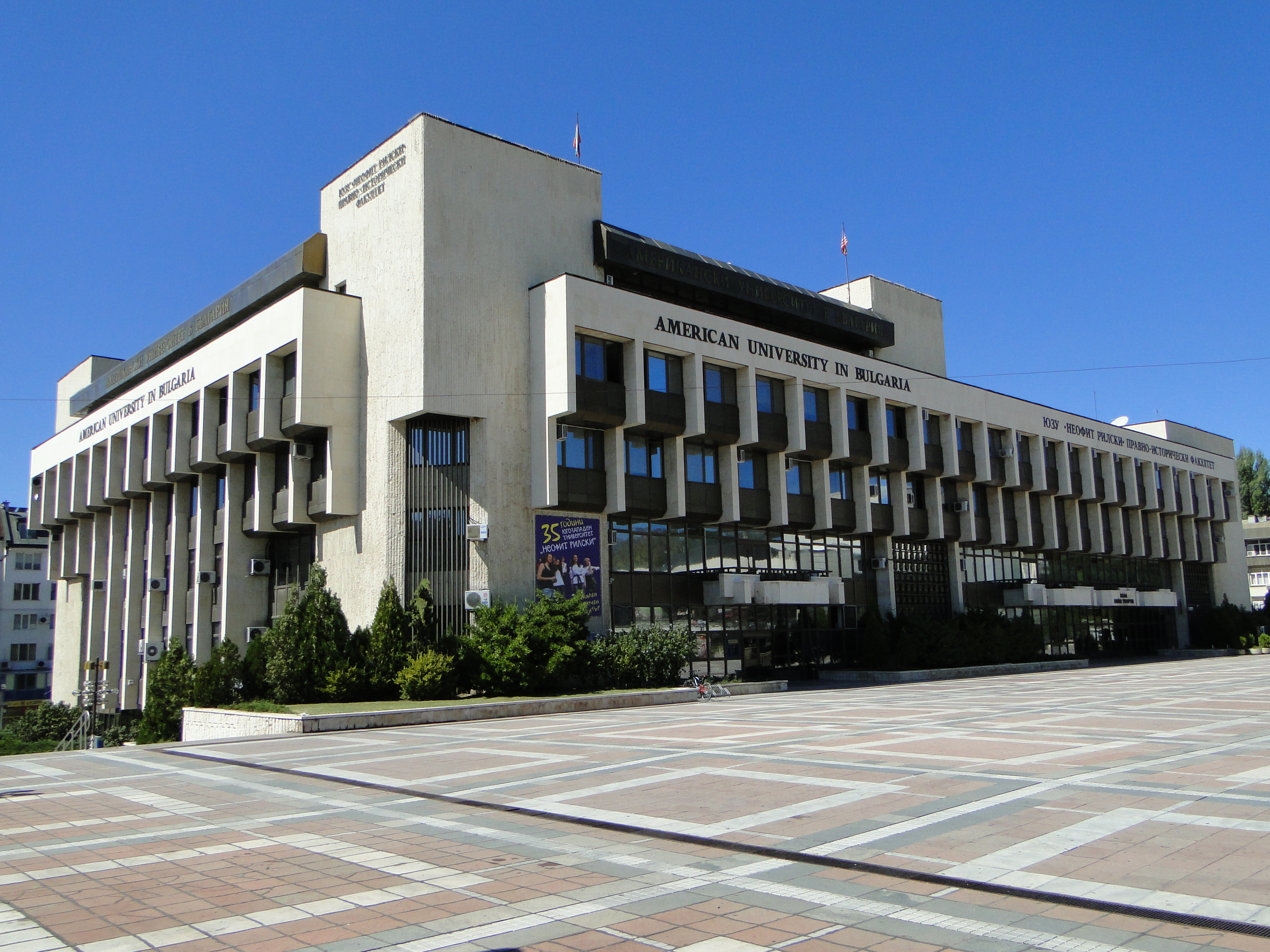
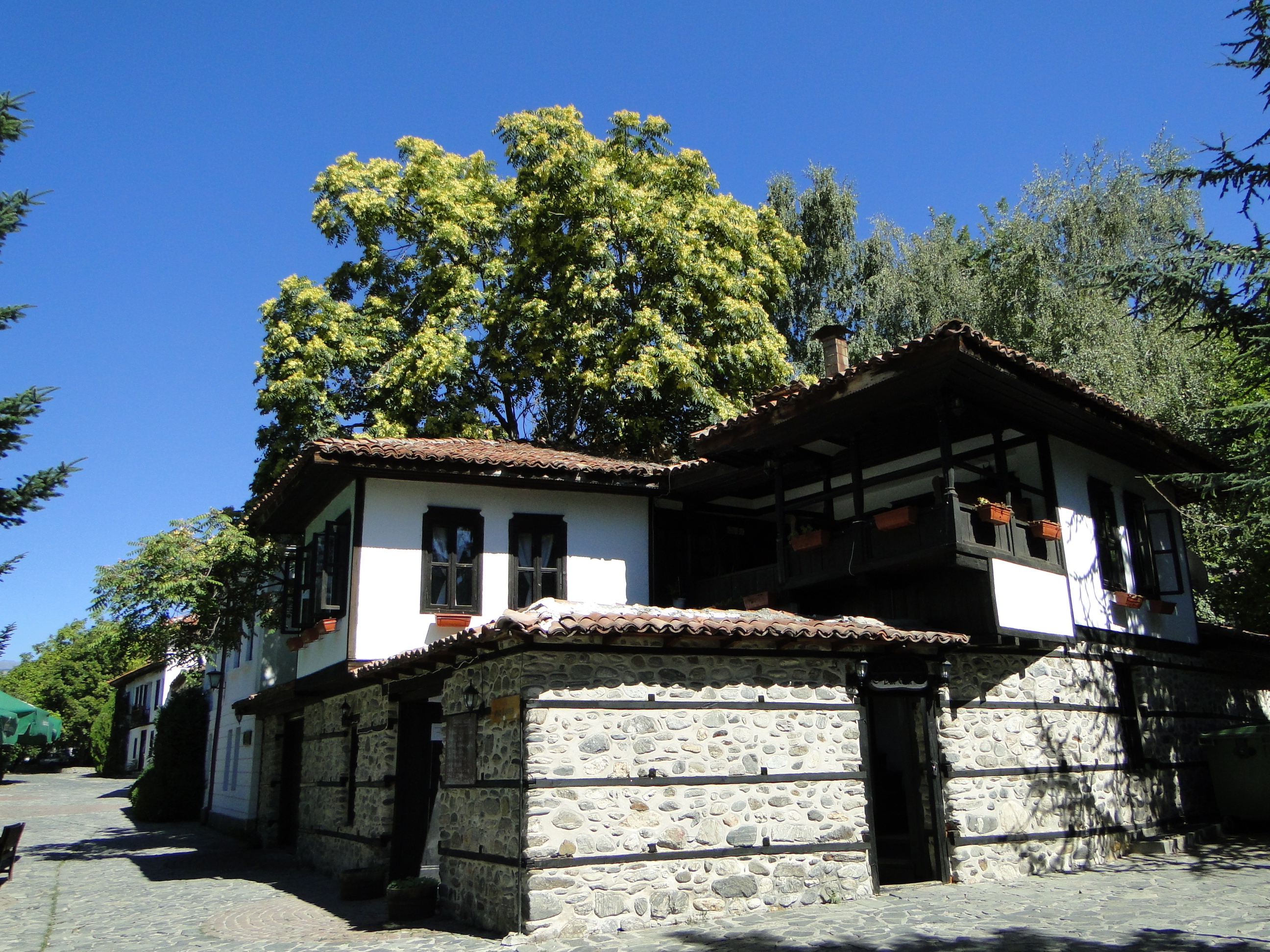
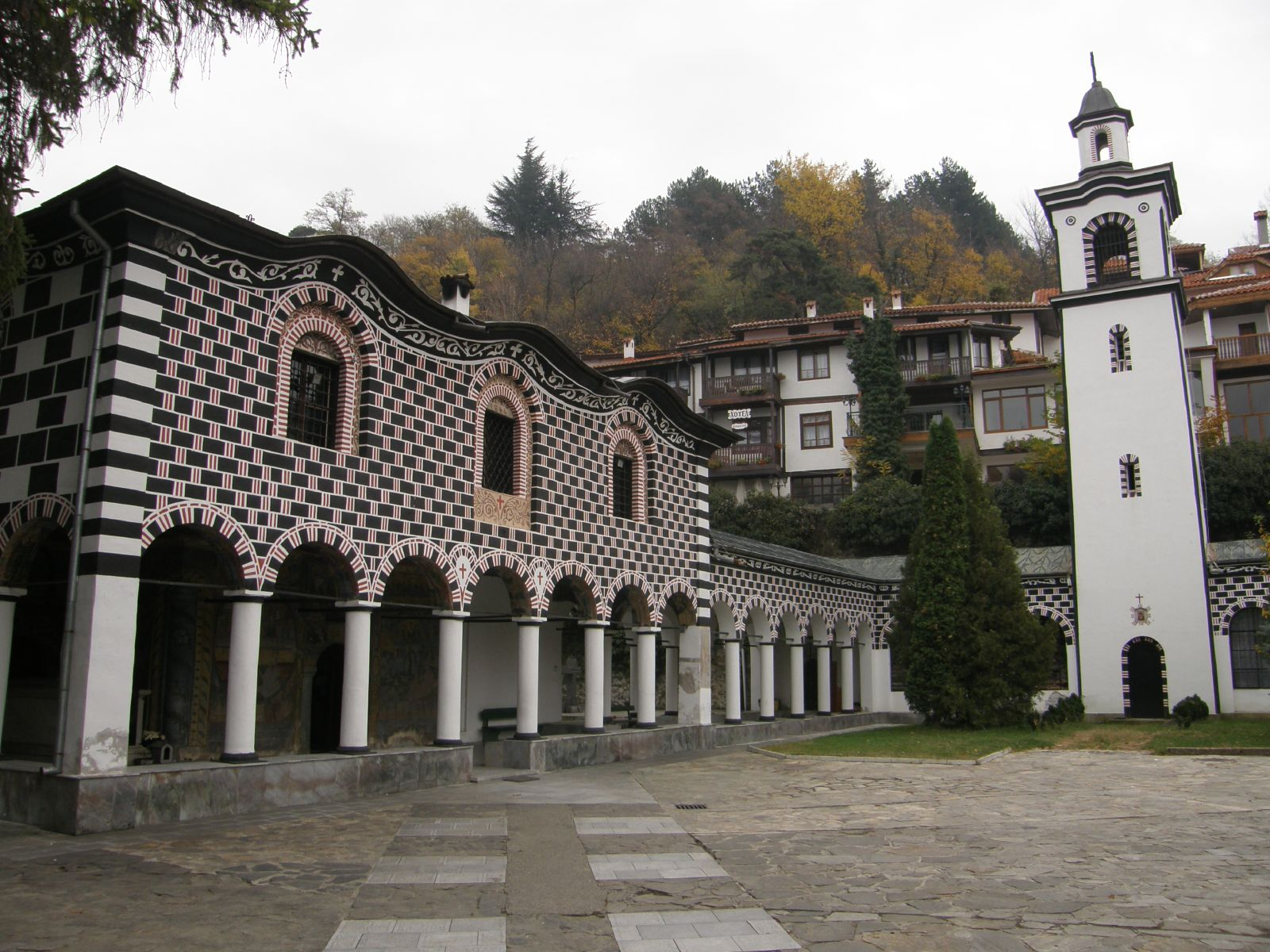
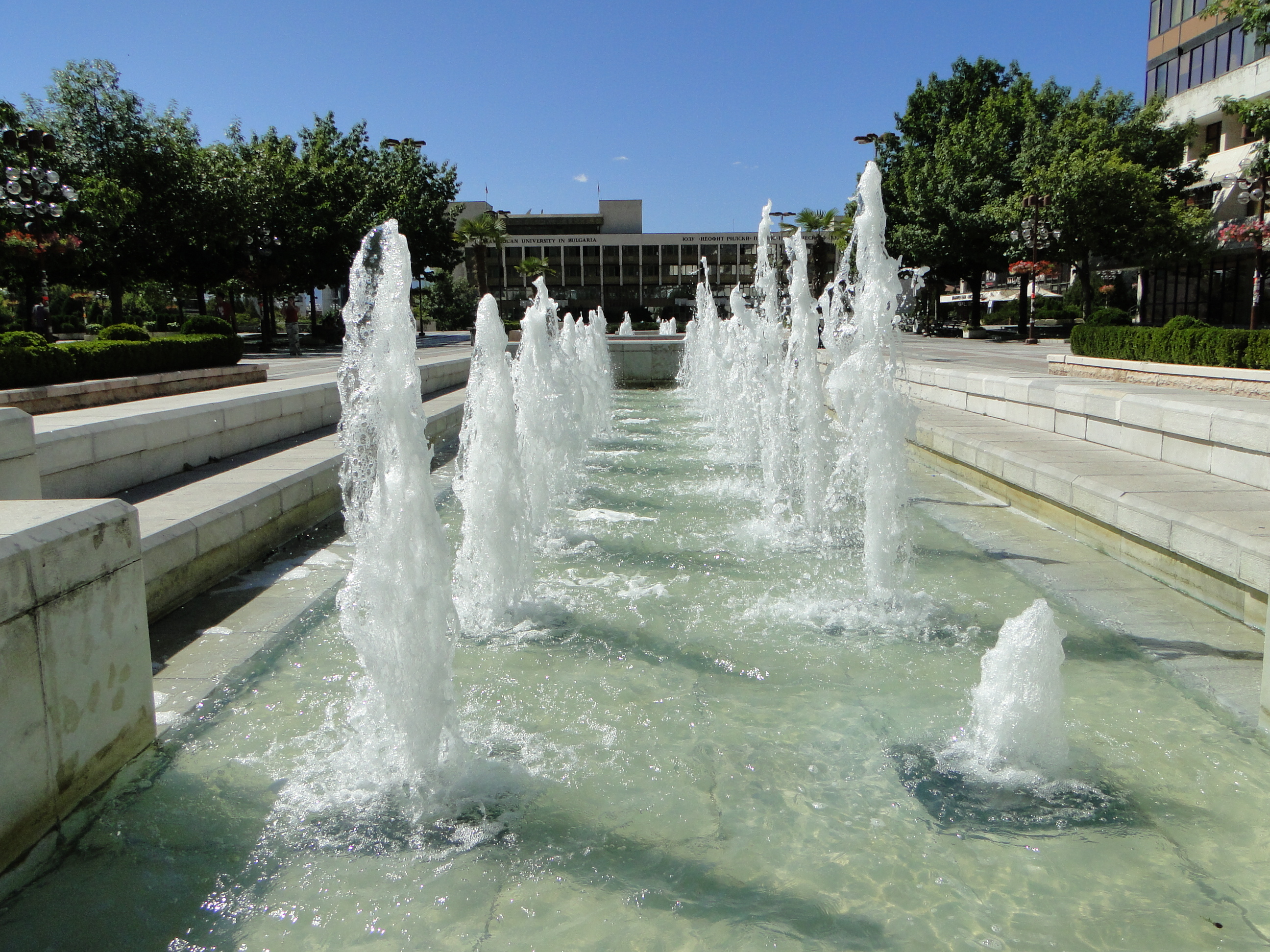
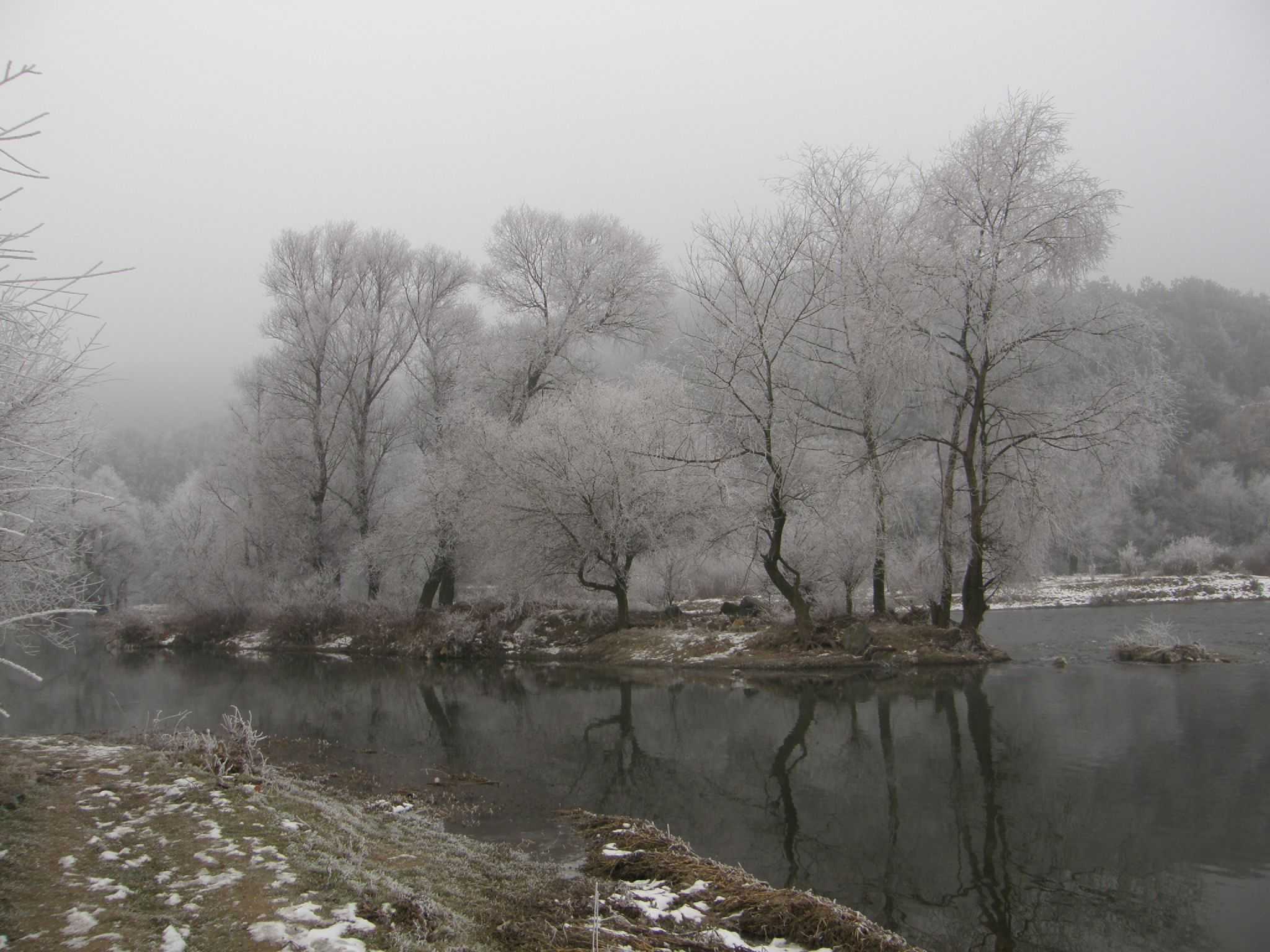

- Coat of arms

- Location of Blagoevgrad Blagoevgrad (Balkans)
- Coordinates: 42°00′43″N 23°05′23″E
- Country: Bulgaria
- Province (Oblast): Blagoevgrad
- Municipality: Blagoevgrad

Government
  - Mayor: Metodi Baykushev (PP-DB)

Area
  - Town: 28.909 km^{2} (11.162 sq mi)
- Elevation: 410 m (1,350 ft)

Population (Census February 2021)
  - Town: 67,810
  - Density: 2,346/km^{2} (6,075/sq mi)
  - Urban: 74,066
- Time zone: UTC+2 (EET)
  - Summer (DST): UTC+3 (EEST)
- Postal Code: 2700
- Area code: 073
- License plate: E
- Climate: Cfa
- Website: Official website

Blagoevgrad (Bulgarian: Благоевград [bɫɐˈɡɔɛvˌɡrat]) is а town in Southwestern Bulgaria, the administrative centre of Blagoevgrad Municipality and of Blagoevgrad Province. With a population of almost 70,000 inhabitants, it is the economic and cultural centre of Southwestern Bulgaria. It is located in the valley of the Struma River at the foot of the Rila Mountains, 101 kilometres (63 miles) south of Sofia, close to the border with North Macedonia.

Blagoevgrad features a pedestrian downtown, with preserved 19th-century architecture and numerous restaurants, cafés, coffee shops, and boutiques. It is home to two universities, the South-West University "Neofit Rilski" and the American University in Bulgaria. The town also hosts the "Sts. Cyril and Methodius National Humanitarian High School". The former Bulgarian Men's High School of Thessaloniki moved from Thessaloniki to Blagoevgrad (then Gorna Dzhumaya) in 1913.

== Name ==
In Ottoman times the town was known as Yukarı Cuma in Turkish or Gorna Dzhumaya in Bulgarian (a partial translation of the Ottoman name). The name Gorna Dzhumaya (Горна Джумая; "Upper Dzhumaya") distinguished the town from Dolna Dzhumaya (Долна Джумая; "Lower Dzhumaya", "Cuma-i Zir" in Turkish) to the south. The second is called today Irakleia, and is in Greece. The Aromanian language still uses this name to refer to the city, as it is known in the language as Giumaia di-Nsus. In comparison, Irakleia ("Lower Dzhumaya") is known as Giumaia di-Nghios.

The town was renamed Blagoevgrad in 1950, after the Bulgarian Workers' Social Democratic Party founder Dimitar Blagoev, who was an immigrant from Ottoman Macedonia.

== History ==
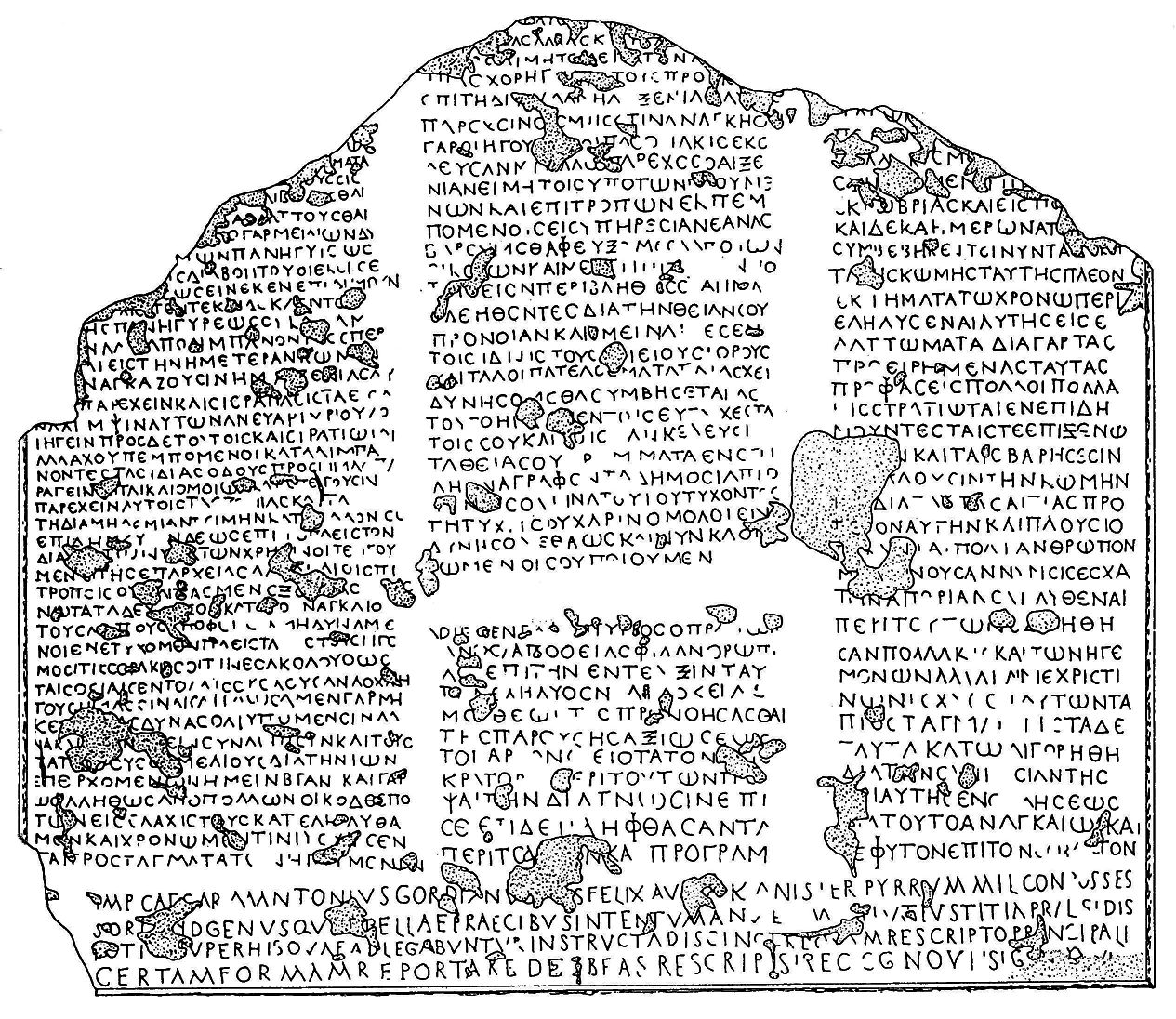
Petition to Roman Emperor Gordian III from the inhabitants of ancient Scaptopara

=== Antiquity ===
A Hellenistic settlement called Scaptopara (market town in Thracian, Σκαπτοπάρα in Greek) emerged on the site of ancient Thracian settlement around 300 BC and was later incorporated into the Roman Empire with the rest of Thrace in 48 AD. The settlement was known for its hot springs supplying thermae. During the Crisis of the Third Century, the Scaptoparans wrote a petition to the emperor Gordian III, whose Latin and Koine Greek text is preserved in an inscription discovered there in 1868, and dated 238 AD. The petition complained about the conduct of soldiers and visitors to the baths and that appeals to the governor of the province of Thrace had failed; the emperor's reply, also inscribed, disclaimed responsibility and again referred the citizens to the governor for redress. The inscription has since been lost. Subsequently, the area was part of the eastern half of the late antique Roman Empire which later became known as the Byzantine Empire.

=== Ottoman Empire ===
Although the history of the settlement in the Middle Ages is unknown, during the Ottoman rule of the Balkans it became a Muslim-majority town called Cuma-ı Bala, meaning Upper Juma in Persian and Ottoman Turkish.

In the middle of the 17th century, the Ottoman traveller Evliya Çelebi passed by here and wrote that the town of Orta Jumaa had 200 tiled houses, a large mosque with many worshippers and 80 souks and many mineral springs.

A Bulgarian quarter called Varosha was formed during the Bulgarian National Revival, with many of its typical houses and the Church of the Presentation of the Mother of God from 1844 being preserved to this day. In the 1830s, the French geologist Ami Boué passed by here and described Dzhumaya as a town of 3,000 to 4,000 inhabitants, where a hereditary voivode lived. The mosques prove that there were many Turks and Pomaks along with the Bulgarians. The streets are paved and very irregular. According to him, the Bulgarians call the town Shuma (from "shuma" - forest). Victor Grigorovich visited the town in 1845. A chitalishte was founded in 1866. Bulgarian scholar Georgi Strezov visited the town in 1891. According to him, there were 1200 houses.

=== First half of 20th century ===
In 1900, according to Vasil Kanchov the population of the town numbered 6440 people, of whom 1250 were Bulgarians, 4500 Turks, 250 Vlachs, 200 Roma, 180 Jews and 60 Greeks. During that time most of the Turks lived in the town and the Bulgarians lived in the surrounding villages. Many refugees from Greek and Vardar Macedonia arrived in the town in the subsequent decades.

The Balkan Wars of 1912-1913 saw the annexation of the area Ottoman rule and its integration in the Bulgarian state in the Treaty of Constantinople. Before the Balkan Wars, Cuma-ı Bala was bounded as kaza to Serez sandjak in Selanik vilayet.

On October 5, 1912, Gorna Dzhumaya was seized by the Bulgarian army. After the Second Balkan War War in 1913, the Turkish population was largely displaced, and large masses of Bulgarian refugees from Aegean and Vardar Macedonia settled in the town. According to Dimitar Gadzhanov, in 1916 Gorna Dzhumaya numbered about 7,000 people, of whom only 30 were Turkish families, 100 families of wealthy Aromanians and a few Jews and Gypsies.

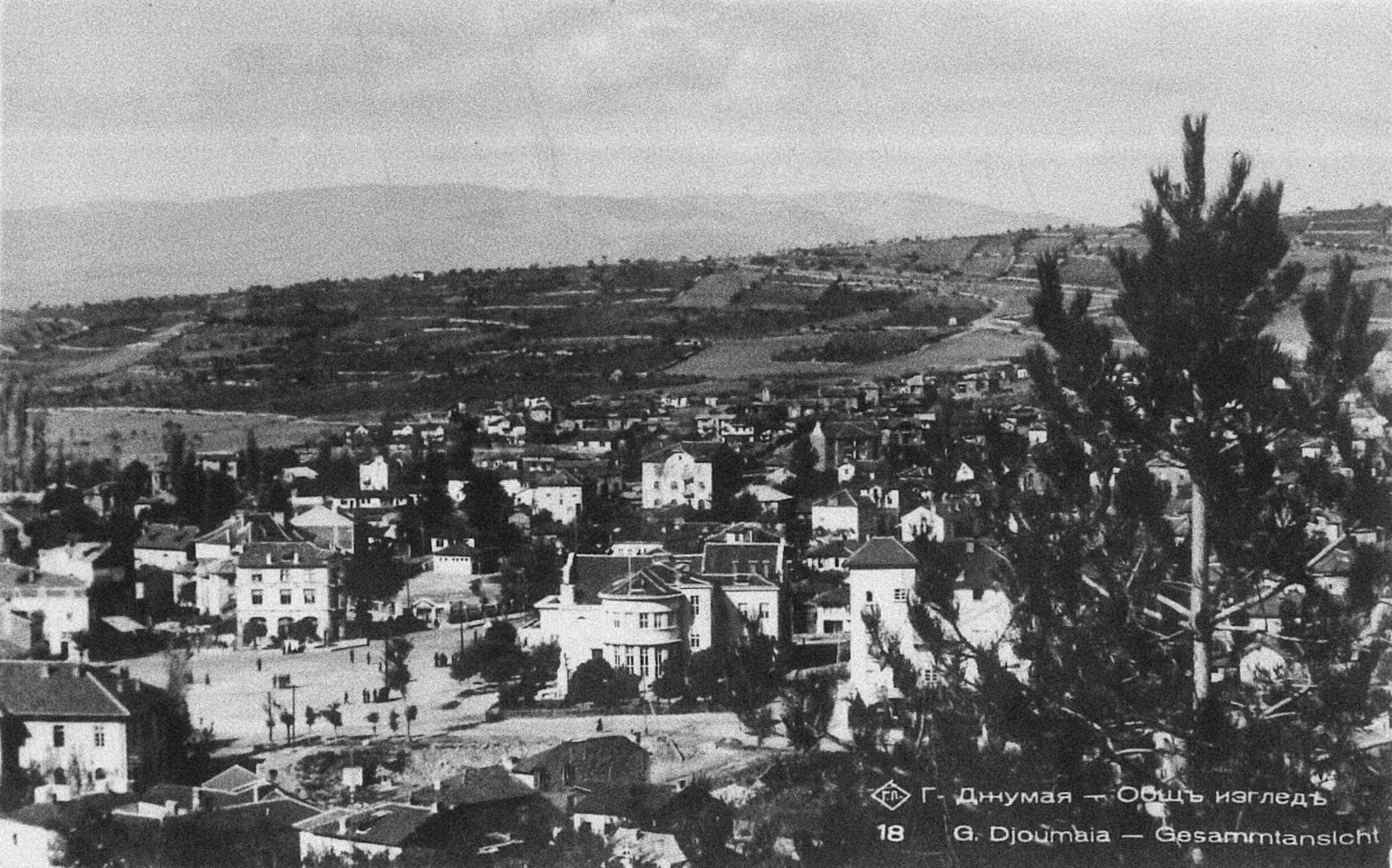
Gorna Dzhumaya in 1940

In March 1943, during World War II, the Bulgarian Commissariat for Jewish Affairs (KEV) established at Gorna Dzhumaya (modern Blagoevgrad) a transit camp for Jews deported from Bulgaria during the Holocaust. The Jews had been arrested in the new "Belomora Oblast" in Bulgarian-occupied Greece and Bulgarian-annexed Pirot in Yugoslavia. The camp consisted of a tobacco warehouse and some school buildings, under the command of KEV official Ivan Tepavski, where inmates were imprisoned and malnourished for 11–12 days before being taken to Lom, embarked for Vienna, and finally exterminated at Treblinka.

== Geography ==
Blagoevgrad is situated in the valley of the Struma and the smaller Blagoevgradska Bistritsa flows through it. It is nestled at 360 m above sea level in the Blagoevgrad valley between the Rila and Vlahina mountains and is in close proximity to Pirin Mountain. Blagoevgrad is 102 km from the capital Sofia, 237 km from Plovdiv, 545 km from Varna and 476 km from Burgas.

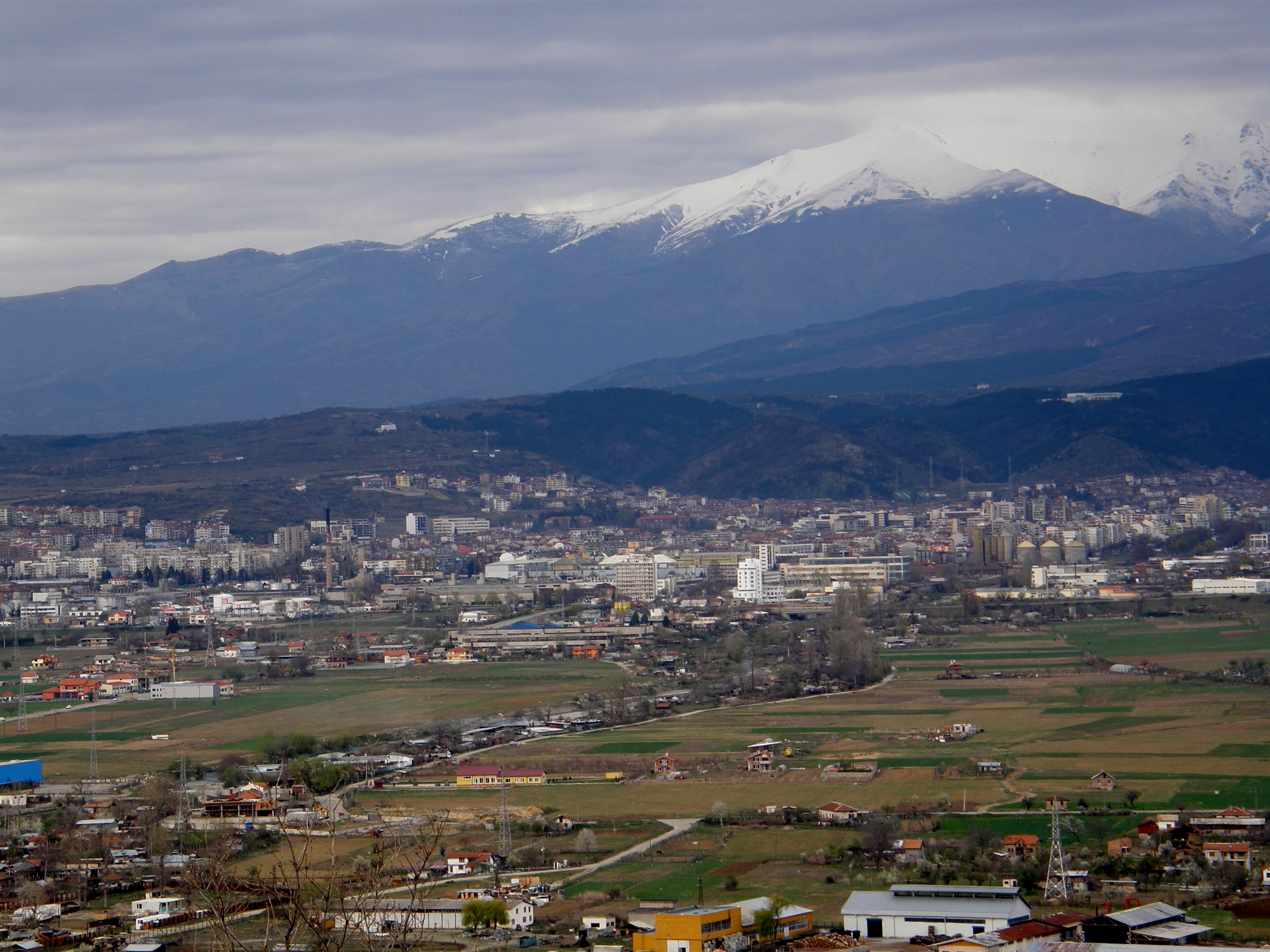
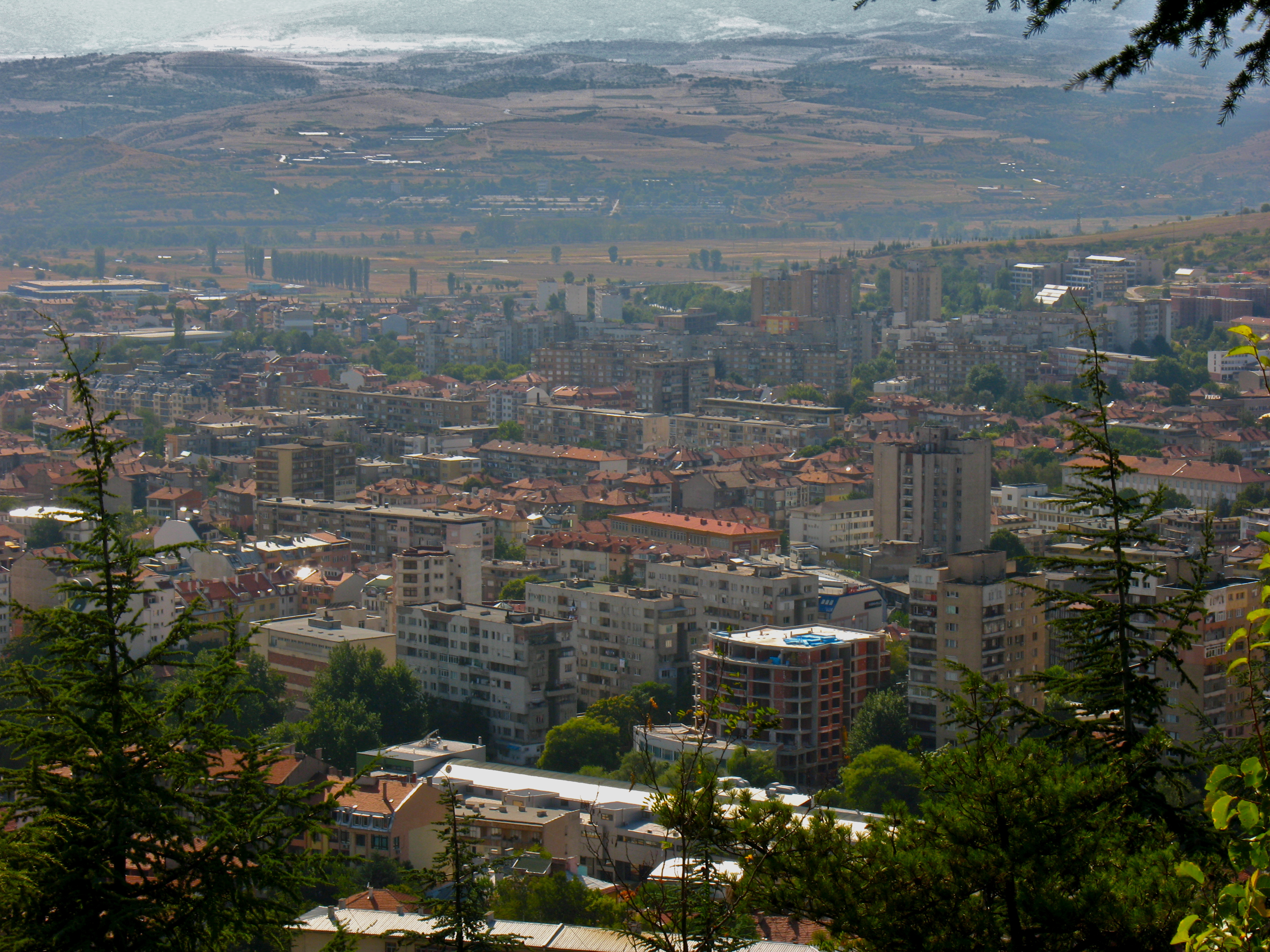

Blagoevgrad has a hot-summer continental climate with influences of a mediterranean climate due to warm air masses coming from the Sandanski-Petrich valley. The town is protected from cold northerly winds due to the natural barrier of the Rila and Pirin mountains. Mountain breeze descends from Rila along the river Blagoevgradska Bistritsa bringing cool air during hot summer days. Wind is moderate - 1.6 metres per second. Thanks to the many mountain forests around the town and the lack of industrial pollution, the air is clean in Blagoevgrad. Winter is mild, brief and marked by little to no snowfall. The average temperature in January is 1.6 °C (35 °F). Summers are long and dry, with a small amount of rainfall. The average July and August temperature is 24 °C (75 °F) and the maximum temperature measured in Blagoevgrad is 44.6 °C (112 °F), while the record low temperature measured is −17.4 °C (1 °F) The average annual temperature is around 13.2 °C (56 °F).

Climate data for Blagoevgrad, Bulgaria (2002-2012)
Month	Jan	Feb	Mar	Apr	May	Jun	Jul	Aug	Sep	Oct	Nov	Dec	Year
Mean daily maximum °C (°F)	6.7 (44.1)	8.9 (48.0)	14.0 (57.2)	20.0 (68.0)	24.6 (76.3)	28.5 (83.3)	31.6 (88.9)	31.9 (89.4)	27.0 (80.6)	20.6 (69.1)	13.7 (56.7)	8.0 (46.4)	19.6 (67.3)
Daily mean °C (°F)	1.5 (34.7)	2.8 (37.0)	7.8 (46.0)	13.1 (55.6)	18.1 (64.6)	21.7 (71.1)	24.7 (76.5)	24.5 (76.1)	20.0 (68.0)	14.1 (57.4)	8.7 (47.7)	3.0 (37.4)	13.5 (56.3)
Mean daily minimum °C (°F)	−2.8 (27.0)	−2.3 (27.9)	1.6 (34.9)	6.4 (43.5)	11.2 (52.2)	14.3 (57.7)	16.5 (61.7)	16.3 (61.3)	12.5 (54.5)	7.6 (45.7)	3.7 (38.7)	−1.1 (30.0)	7.5 (45.5)
Average precipitation mm (inches)	42 (1.7)	37 (1.5)	35 (1.4)	50 (2.0)	58 (2.3)	67 (2.6)	42 (1.7)	31 (1.2)	35 (1.4)	50 (2.0)	63 (2.5)	49 (1.9)	560 (22.0)
Average snowy days	7	5	2	0	0	0	0	0	0	0	0	3	17
Mean monthly sunshine hours	90	122	173	229	276	319	328	322	228	166	111	71	2,435
Source: Stringmeteo.com

== Economy and infrastructure ==
=== Economy ===
Because of the large number of students (partly due to the South-West University and the American University in the town), its cross-road location, nature and number of social factors, the town has a relatively well developed economy. There are many clothing stores, cafés, and restaurants. The district has the sixth largest economy in Bulgaria, for its share of the GDP, after the more industrial districts of Sofia City, Varna, Sofia District, Plovdiv, and Burgas. The number of people registered as unemployed is slightly below 10%, less than the average for the country.

Industries of interest:

1. Food and tobacco processing industries - Animal products, fruit, vegetables, tobacco, and liquor production. High export potential.
2. Textile industry - Foreign investors have helped the development of many firms that produce ready-made clothing.
3. Timber and furniture industries - The easy access to local resources makes gives that branch perspectives for development. There are open foreign markets for furniture. Increasing interest of foreign investors.
4. Iron processing and machinery industry - Firms specialize mainly in production of metal constructions and details. Radio-electronic equipment and other electronic communication components are being produced.
5. Construction materials industry - The terrain characteristics are suitable for the extraction of certain minerals, used in construction. Marble is extracted at numerous locations in Sandanski municipality, Koprivlen, Petrich, Strumyani.
6. Education - The town is also a huge student center thanks to AUBG and SWU "Neofit Rilski".
7. Other - Tourism, pharmaceuticals, plastics, paper, shoes.

==== Real Estate ====
The town is very attractive to investors, both foreign and native. It is no coincidence that Blagoevgrad is the third largest town by number of building permits. Blagoevgrad is growing and the small bordering villages of Elenovo and Strumsko are now considered part of it. Recently there was a major overhaul of the town park and a new bridge was built.

==== Industries ====
Currently the town has seven hypermarkets: Metro, Technopolis, Technomarket Europe, Mr. Bricolage, Billa, Kaufland, and Lidl.

Since 2015, the largest shopping mall in Southwest Bulgaria - "Largo" - has been operating in the city.

=== Transport ===
The town is situated on the European road E-79 and the Republican road I-1. Blagoevgrad is 31 km away from North Macedonia, 83 km away from Greece, 88 km away from Serbia. The distance to Sofia is 96 km, to Plovdiv it is 193 km and to Skopje (the capital of North Macedonia) - 183 km. The town is a main crossroad for tourists who want to visit the mountains and their ski resorts such as Bansko, Dobrinishte, Sandanski.

=== Media ===
In Blagoevgrad is located one of the four regional centers of BNT - RTVC Blagoevgrad, broadcasting its own production since 1975 and its Channel Pirin, distributed over the air throughout Southwestern Bulgaria. Here is also the headquarters of the regional channel OKO, which is distributed by cable in the settlements of Blagoevgrad region. There are 2 cable TV channels Telecom Group and Pirin TV.

Of the radio stations of regional importance, Radio Blagoevgrad, a division of BNR, stands out, which for 35 years has been on the air from Sofia to Kulata, Eastern North Macedonia and Northern Greece. The private radio networks Focus Pirin and Darik Blagoevgrad also have their own local programmes. The Blagoevgrad student radio Aura, the regional Ultra and Vega Plus, as well as numerous radios with national coverage complement the airwaves of Blagoevgrad.

Two daily newspapers are published in Blagoevgrad - "Struma" and "Vyara", distributed throughout Southwest Bulgaria. In addition, "Pirin Trud" and "Local 24 Hours" are published and distributed in the city and the region.

== Population ==
According to the 2021 census, Blagoevgrad has population of 67,810 people.

Historical population
Year	Pop.	±%
1920	7,009	—
1934	9,977	+42.3%
1946	14,200	+42.3%
1956	21,833	+53.8%
1965	32,680	+49.7%
1975	50,023	+53.1%
1985	64,882	+29.7%
1992	71,476	+10.2%
2001	71,144	−0.5%
2011	70,881	−0.4%
2021	62,534	−11.8%

=== Ethnic linguistic and religious composition ===
According to the 2011 census, the individuals declared their ethnic identity were distributed as follows:

- Bulgarians: 62,674 (95.6%)
- Romani: 1,813 (2.8%)
- Turks: 123 (0.2%)
- Others: 684 (1.0%)
- Indefinable: 271 (0.4%)
  - Undeclared: 5,316 (7.5%)

Total: 70,881.

Today, Blagoevgrad is one of the few places in Bulgaria where members of the small Aromanian minority of the country still live.

The Eastern Orthodox population of the town in the 19th-20th centuries was traditionally part of the Diocese of Nevrokop (since 1894 part of the Bulgarian Exarchate). After the division of the diocese between Bulgaria and Greece in 1913, from 1921 to 1928 Gorna Dzhumaya was its centre. From 1928 to 1941 and from 1945 to 1951, the seat of the diocese was temporarily in Nevrokop, and in 1951 it was finally moved to Blagoevgrad. The head of the diocese from 1994 to 2013 was Metropolitan Nathanael.

=== Sports ===
Generally, sports are well developed, but the town's traditionally strong sports, handball and basketball, have been in financial crisis and without representation in the national leagues in years past (only supporting children and youth ensembles).

The crisis in basketball and handball provides others with the opportunity to pick up pace. Taekwon-Do, in the form of "Falcon" club has given Blagoevgrad and Bulgaria multiple European and World Championship medals, including a European Championship in 2004 (Todor Kozladerov). Baseball is a little-known sport in Bulgaria but it thrives in Blagoevgrad. The local team's name is the "Buffaloes" and its manager is Yassen Nedelchev, who also serves as the Bulgarian Baseball Federation's president. In 2010, the "Blagoevgrad Buffaloes" won their 17th National title (in 18 attempts).

The town has two multi-purpose sports halls, the second was opened in 2007, it has a capacity of over 1000 seats and meets all requirements of the International Federation of handball, basketball and volleyball, a game area may be used for competitions Rhythmic gymnastics and martial arts. The town has three well-maintained complexes for tennis, a football stadium, six small playgrounds for football, an Olympic size swimming pool, a go-cart track and one of the best games of baseball in the Balkans. In 2008 construction began on a new sports complex at the South-West University "Neofit Rilski" for the needs of its students.

Despite the well-developed infrastructure for the sports facilities, Blagoevgrad citizens often use the public space of Bachinovo park in order to jog, commit to sports activities, such as football, rugby, and frisbee and develop the community sports environment, typical for post-Soviet culture of Bulgaria.

The new facility of AUBG, the ABF center serves as occasional facilitator of the national volleyball training and competitions.

=== Football ===
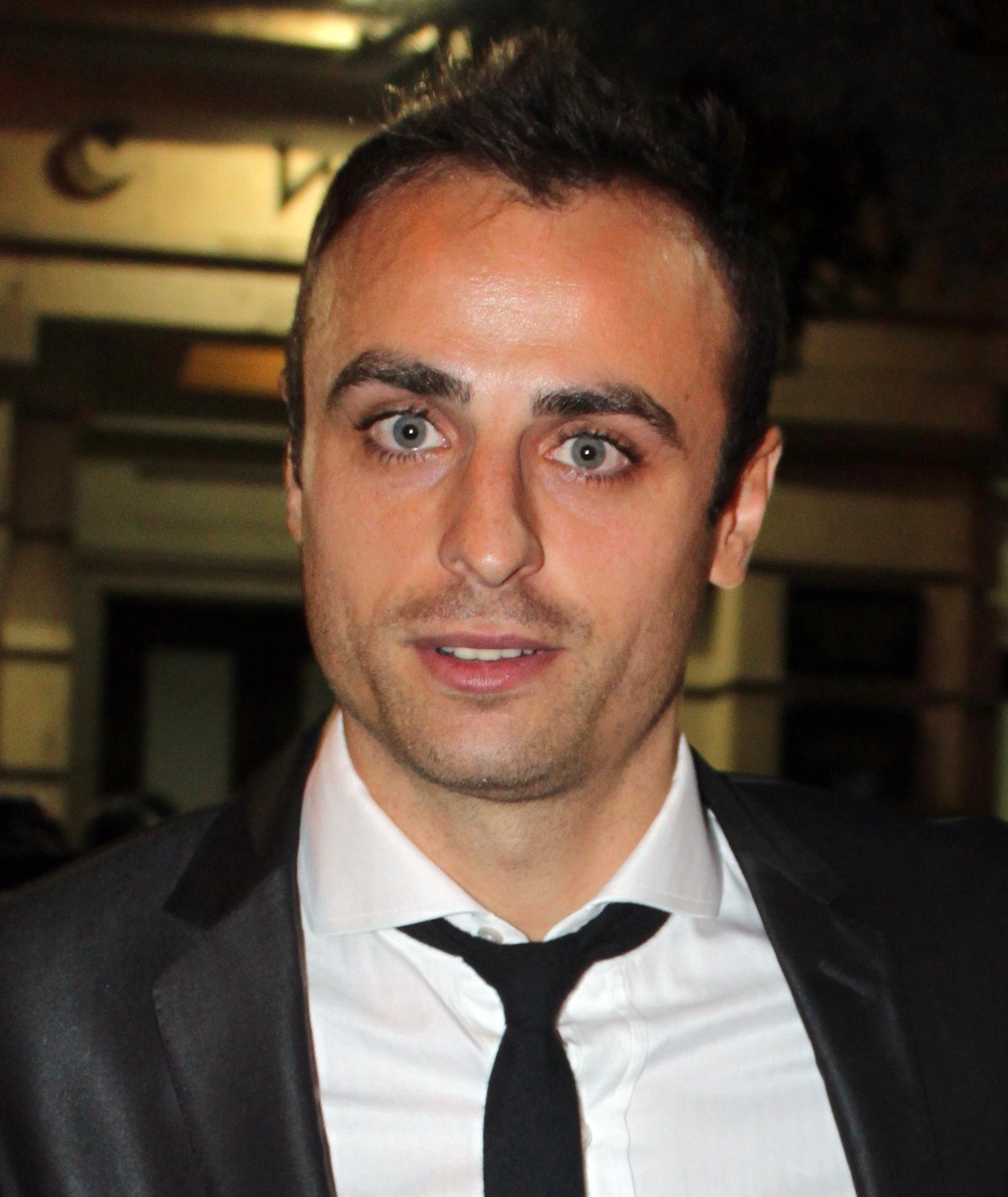
Footballer Dimitar Berbatov is from Blagoevgrad

Blagoevgrad has given Bulgaria and world football talents such as Dimitar Berbatov and regularly feeds the wealthy football clubs. Local team investment is lacking.

At present in Blagoevgrad there are four active male clubs, three of which bear the name "Pirin". The "A" group is PFC Pirin Blagoevgrad. Pirin Authentic, then discard it in "B" group in 2005 due to obligations to Social Security, was usurped by a group of businessmen D15, and then failed to return to professional football during the 2008/09 season and will play in the Western B Group . Pirin 2001 - the team owned by former international Ivaylo Andonov, competed in the Southwestern 'B' group. In the championship of the Blagoevgrad District League (zone "Bistritsa") features one Blagoevgrad football team - FC Athletic.

Women's football is represented by the football club Sportika - a participant in the National Championship for Women

=== Arts and Culture ===
Francofolies Blagoevgrad is the host of the most important francophone music festival "Francofolies", which takes place annually in only few other locations: La Rochelle, France; Montreal, Canada, Spa, Belgium. The festival has attracted some big names, including French pop singers Patrick Bruel, Patricia Kaas, Zaz, rapper Fefe, and the groups Nouvelle Vague and Gypsy Kings.

Bansko International Jazz Festival Blagoevgrad is also one hour away from the prestigious Bansko Jazz Festival. which takes place every year in August. Former participants of Bansko Jazz Fest include Jamie Davis, Joss Stone, and Vasil Petrov.

Bulgarian National Radio Awards Blagoevgrad was also chosen by the BNR to host its annual awards show, which brought to the city Bulgaria's greatest musical talents. The recently inaugurated Art Salon of Radio Blagoevgrad is the host of monthly art shows, book opening presentations and exhibits.

=== Universities ===
- South-West University "Neofit Rilski"
- American University in Bulgaria

== International relations ==
=== Twin towns – sister cities ===
Blagoevgrad is twinned with:

- Auburn, AL, United States
- Čakovec, Croatia
- Prilep, North Macedonia
- Serres, Greece
- Akademgorodok, Russia
- Lund, Sweden
- Székesfehérvár, Hungary
- (Georgia (country)) Batumi, Georgia
- Žilina, Slovakia

== Main Sights ==
- Old Town, the Varosha Quarter
- Drama Theatre "N. Vaptsarov"
- Blagoevgrad History Museum
- Blagoevgrad Opera House

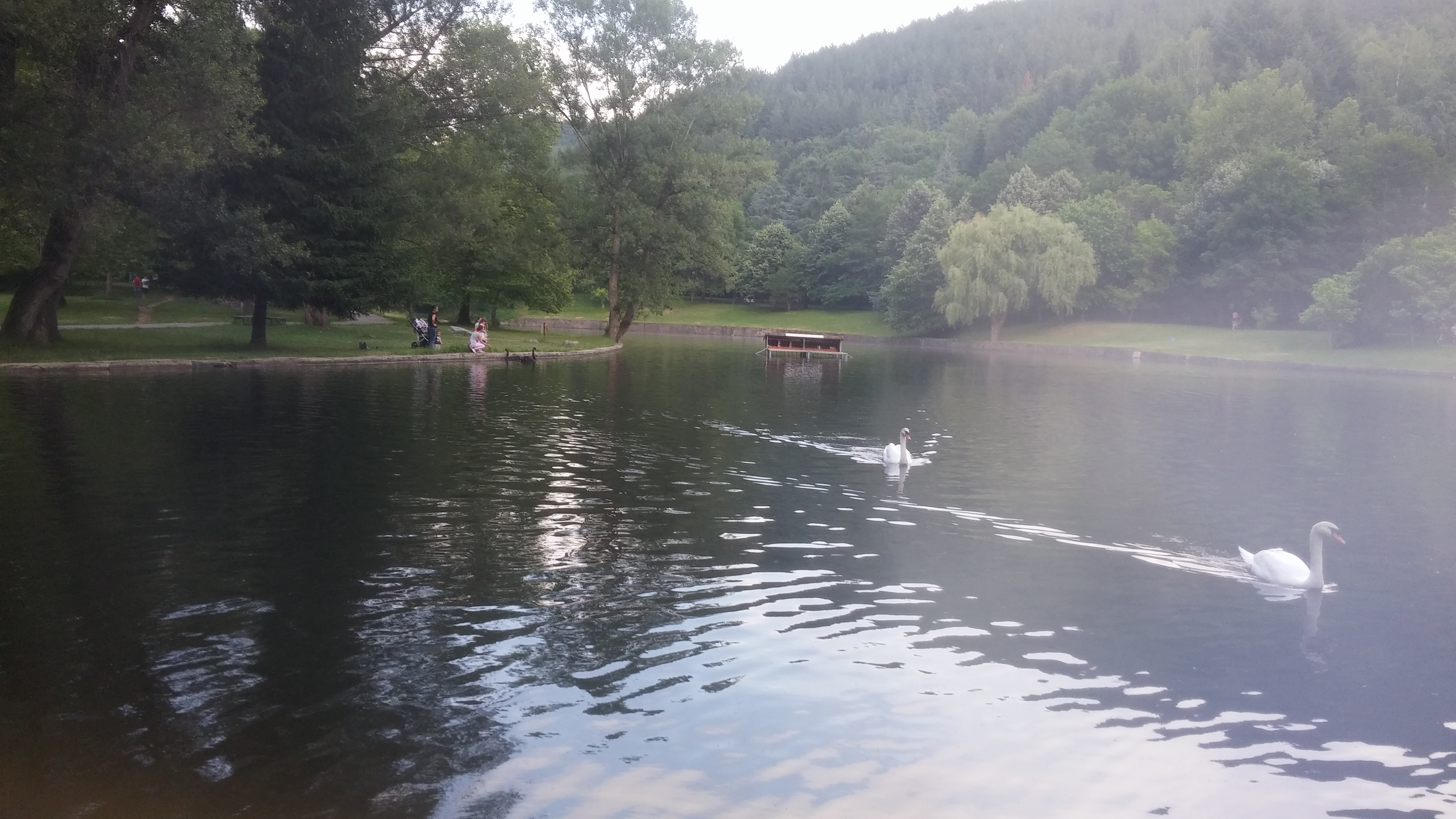

- Historic House Museum "Georgi Izmirliev"
- Park "Bachinovo"
- Park "Skaptopara"
- Aqua park Blagoevgrad
- Blagoevgrad zoo
- Cross site

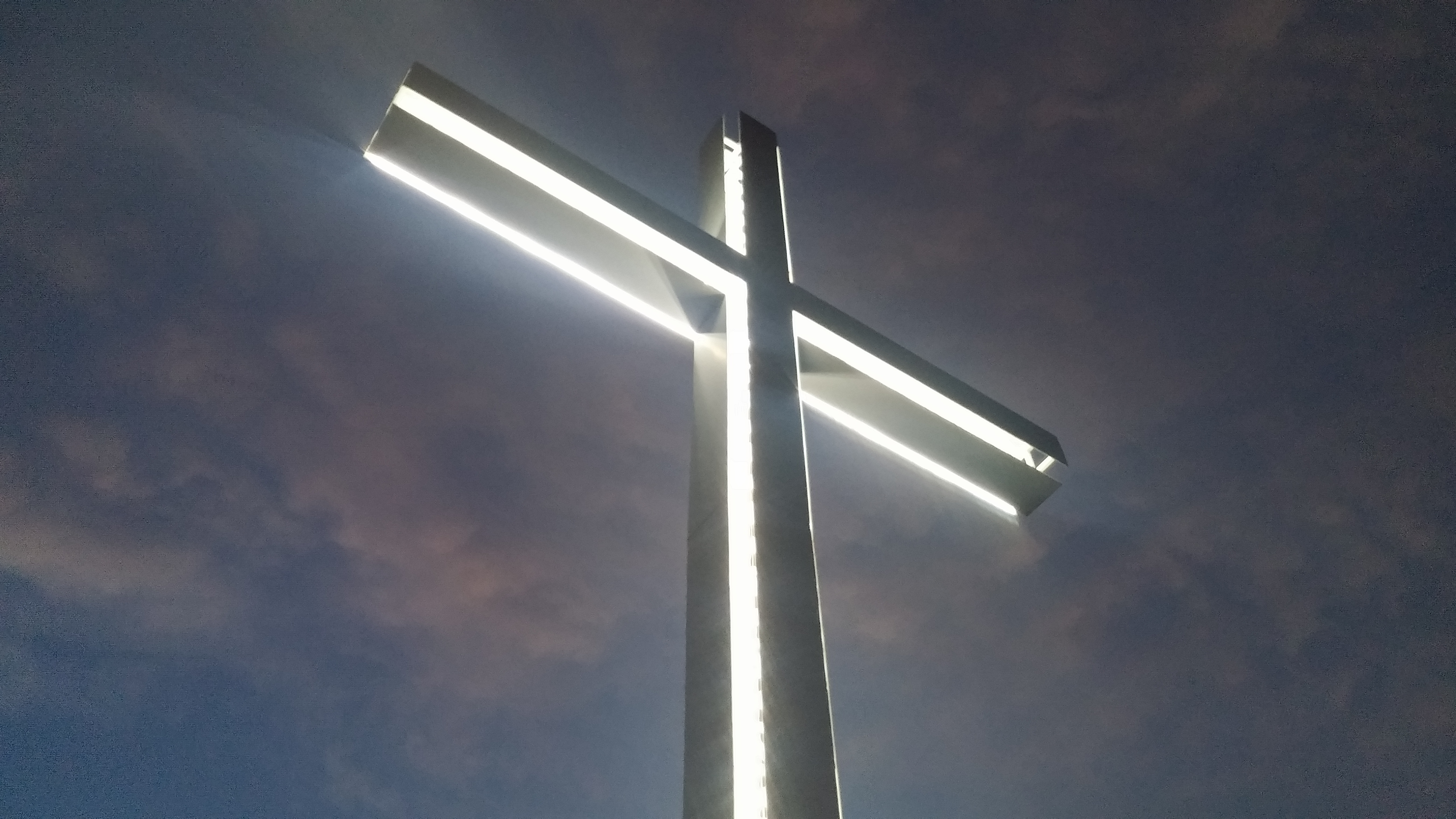

- Todor Alexandrov Street
- Attractions in the surrounding area include the resort Bodrost.

== Honours ==
Blagoevgrad Peninsula in Graham Land, Antarctica is named after the city, and Skaptopara Cove in Greenwich Island in the South Shetland Islands, Antarctica is named after its ancient ancestor Skaptopara.
