= Bodrost =

Ski resort in Bulgaria

Coordinates: 42°2′43″N 23°20′16″E

Bodrost (Bulgarian: Бодрост) is a tourism and ski resort near Blagoevgrad, Bulgaria. Bodrost is located in the valley of the Blagoevgradska Bistritsa, it is 30 km (19 mi) east from Blagoevgrad at around 1250m above sea level. It is an entry point to the Rila National Park. The Bodrost hut is located in the resort.
