= Tajikistan Humanitarian International University =

Tajikistan Humanitarian International University is a university in Tajikistan. It is located in Dushanbe.
