= International University of Humanities and Development =

University in Ashgabat, Turkmenistan

International University for the Humanities and Development
- Halkara Ynsanperwer Ylymlary we Ösüş Uniwersiteti
- Established: 2014
- Rector: Maral Mämmetberdiýewna Kuliýewa
- Administrative staff: 132
- Students: 2,000 (planned capacity), 1627 (current enrollment)
- Location: 1958 (Andalyp) Street, 169; 744000, Ashgabat, Turkmenistan
- Campus: Urban
- Website: https://iuhd.edu.tm/

The International University for Humanities and Development (Turkmen: Halkara Ynsanperwer Ylymlary we Ösüş Uniwersiteti, HYY we ÖU) was opened in September 2014 as an English-medium institution of higher education in Turkmenistan. It was created by presidential decree on May 16, 2014. Esen Aydogdyev, a career diplomat, was appointed the university's first rector in July 2014. Maral Kuliýewa, a career pedagogue, succeeded him in November 2023.

== Curriculum ==
The university includes six colleges ("faculties" — fakultetler in Turkmen): social sciences, (English) language learning department, international economy and management, international law and international relations, international technologies, and international advancement. These colleges are further subdivided into 13 departments (kafedralar). Degrees are offered in 14 major fields of study, including philosophy, sociology, international journalism, international relations and world politics, international public law, international private law, international economy, international trade, international finance, insurance, international management, computer technology, computer programming, information and communication technology. All instruction is in English and tuition fees are charged.

According to the State News Agency of Turkmenistan.

In this regard, students will attend one-year advanced language training courses and study terminology of their chosen specialization. The two-tier of higher education system will be used at this educational institution for the first time in Turkmenistan — turkmen students will study bachelor's degree and master’s degree — in line with requirements for the establishment of unified globally recognized educational standards.

The university intends to follow the Bologna Process, and to offer four-year baccalaureate and two-year master's degrees.

== Facilities ==
The university campus includes the main building with capacity of 2,000 students, three dormitories, cafeteria, an indoor athletic facility, outdoor volleyball, basketball and tennis courts, and automobile parking.
