= Department of International Relations and Diplomacy, Tribhuvan University =

International relations school of Tribhuvan University

Department of International Relations and Diplomacy, Tribhuvan University (DIRD, TU)
- अन्तर्राष्ट्रिय सम्बन्ध तथा कूटनीति विभाग, त्रिभुवन विश्वविद्यालय
- Established: February 16, 2014
- Parent institution: Tribhuvan University
- Students: 350
- Location: University Campus, Kirtipur, Nepal
- Website: https://dirdtu.edu.np/

Department of International Relations and Diplomacy (DIRD) (Nepali: अन्तर्राष्ट्रिय सम्बन्ध तथा कूटनीति विभाग) is a department in Tribhuvan University which was earlier known as Master's Program in International Relations and Diplomacy (MIRD), a two-year (four-semester) post-graduate program introduced by Tribhuvan University in 2014, and is running under Faculty of Humanities and Social Sciences. The Doctoral course on International Relations and Diplomacy was introduced in 2018, which aims to encourage and publish original and rigorous research in the field.

MIRD is the first ever program introduced for the study of International Relations and Diplomacy in Nepal.

MIRD program is multidisciplinary in nature as it draws key insights from multiple disciplines in social sciences, humanities, and philosophy to provide students with the broader understanding of international affairs.
