= South-West University "Neofit Rilski" =

Public university in Blagoevgrad, Bulgaria

Southwest University "Neofit Rilski"
- Югозападен университет „Неофит Рилски“
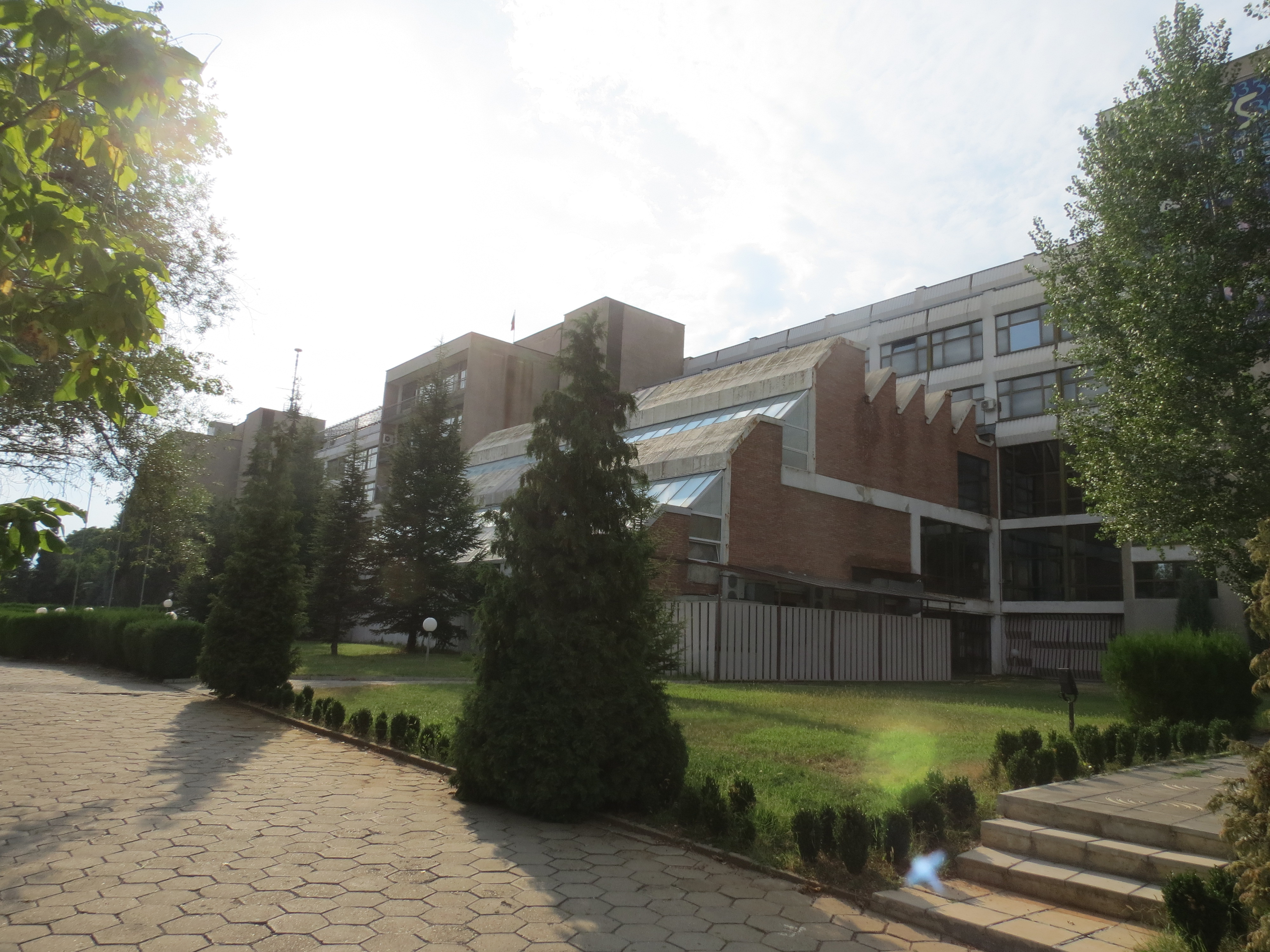
- Type: Public
- Established: 1975
- Rector: Nikolai Marin
- Academic staff: 470
- Students: 12,579
- Location: Blagoevgrad, Bulgaria; 42°1′6″N 23°4′38″E
- Website: www.swu.bg

The South-West University "Neofit Rilski" (Bulgarian: Югозападен университет "Неофит Рилски") is a university in Blagoevgrad, Bulgaria. It was founded in 1975. The patron of the university in Blagoevgrad is the patriarch of the new Bulgarian education Neofit Rilski (Neophyte of Rila).

== History ==
The university was first founded as a branch of Sofia University. The first 200 students admitted in 1976/77 had two specialties: pedagogy for the preparation of teachers for kindergartens and for primary schools. In this way, for the first time, Bulgaria started preparing teachers with university degrees for kindergartens and primary schools. The tutorials were realized by three professors, two associate professors and thirteen assistant professors.

With Act No. 2296, 4 August 1983, of the State Council of the Republic of Bulgaria (State Newspaper No. 62/1983), the branch was transformed into separate institute. The institute was looking for own image and own way in the preparation of teachers. Two years later in 1985, the Scientific Council started functioning. It has the right to elect associate professors in Pedagogy, Psychology, Defectology and Methodology of Teaching. Many new specialties like Mathematics, Physics, Bulgarian Language and Literature, Bulgarian Language and History found places in the study programmes. In 1990 the university realized the education of full- and part-time students in five faculties and in ten specialties.

The institute more and more confirms itself as higher school of university type and starts admission of foreign students.

After 1990, under the influence of the processes of democratization in all spheres of the social life and in accordance with the Law for Academic Autonomy, the Higher School in Blagoevgrad developed at accelerated rates. New specialties and faculties were created. Alongside the education financed by the state, paid education was introduced. In regard to the level of development and the high demand of specialists with university degree especially in the field of Economics, Law and the social activities, with decision of the People's Assembly dated July 1995 (State Newspaper No. 68/1995), the Higher Pedagogical Institute, Blagoevgrad becomes Southwest University Neophyte of Rila, Blagoevgrad.

In this act are reflected the following:

- Conformity with the requirements of clause 17, paragraph 2, p. 1 of the Law for Higher Education for the preparation of specialists in specialties from the basic fields of science: humanitarian, social, natural and technical.
- Existence of the necessary teaching and scientific staff.
- Considerable structural changes in the Higher School. Created are the Faculty of Economy, the Faculty of Law and the Medico-pedagogical Faculty. New humanitarian, natural-scientific, pedagogical and technological specialties are created.

On 27 January 1997 with Act No. 16 of the Council of Ministers, the College of Machine Building and Electrotechnics, Blagoevgrad is transformed into Technical College, affiliated in the structure of the Southwest University, Blagoevgrad.

== Organization ==
The university is divided into seven faculties and one college:

- Faculty of Law and History
- Faculty of Economics
- Faculty of Art
- Faculty of Mathematics and Natural Science
- Faculty of Pedagogy
- Faculty of Philosophy
- Faculty of Philology
- College of Technical Science
