= Strumyani =

Strumyani Струмяни
- Location of Strumyani
- Coordinates: 41°38′N 23°12′E
- Country: Bulgaria
- Provinces (Oblast): Blagoevgrad Province
- Municipality: Strumyani Municipality

Government
  - Mayor: Valentin Chilikov
- Elevation: 128 m (420 ft)

Population (2008)
  - Total: 1,014
- Time zone: UTC+2 (EET)
  - Summer (DST): UTC+3 (EEST)
- Postal Code: 2825
- Area code: 07434

Strumyani (Bulgarian: Струмяни, pronounced [stroˈmʲani]; also transliterated Strumjani or Strumiani) is a village in southwestern Bulgaria, part of Blagoevgrad Province. It is the administrative centre of Strumyani Municipality, which lies in the southwestern part of Blagoevgrad Province.

Strumyani was founded as a railway station on the Sofia-Kulata line named Gara Ograzhden ("Ograzhden Station"). In 1970, it was merged with the village of Mikrevo to form Strumyani, but the two villages were later separated; however, Strumyani kept its present name. The name means "people of the Struma," as the river runs nearby.
