= Faculty of International Relations, University of Economics in Bratislava =

Coordinates: 48°08′N 17°08′E

Faculty of International Relations
- Fakulta medzinárodných vzťahov
- Type: Faculty
- Established: 2000
- Parent institution: University of Economics in Bratislava
- Dean: Dr.h.c. prof. Ing. Ľudmila Lipková, CSc.
- Academic staff: 52
- Students: 657
- Location: Bratislava, Slovakia
- Website: fmv.euba.sk

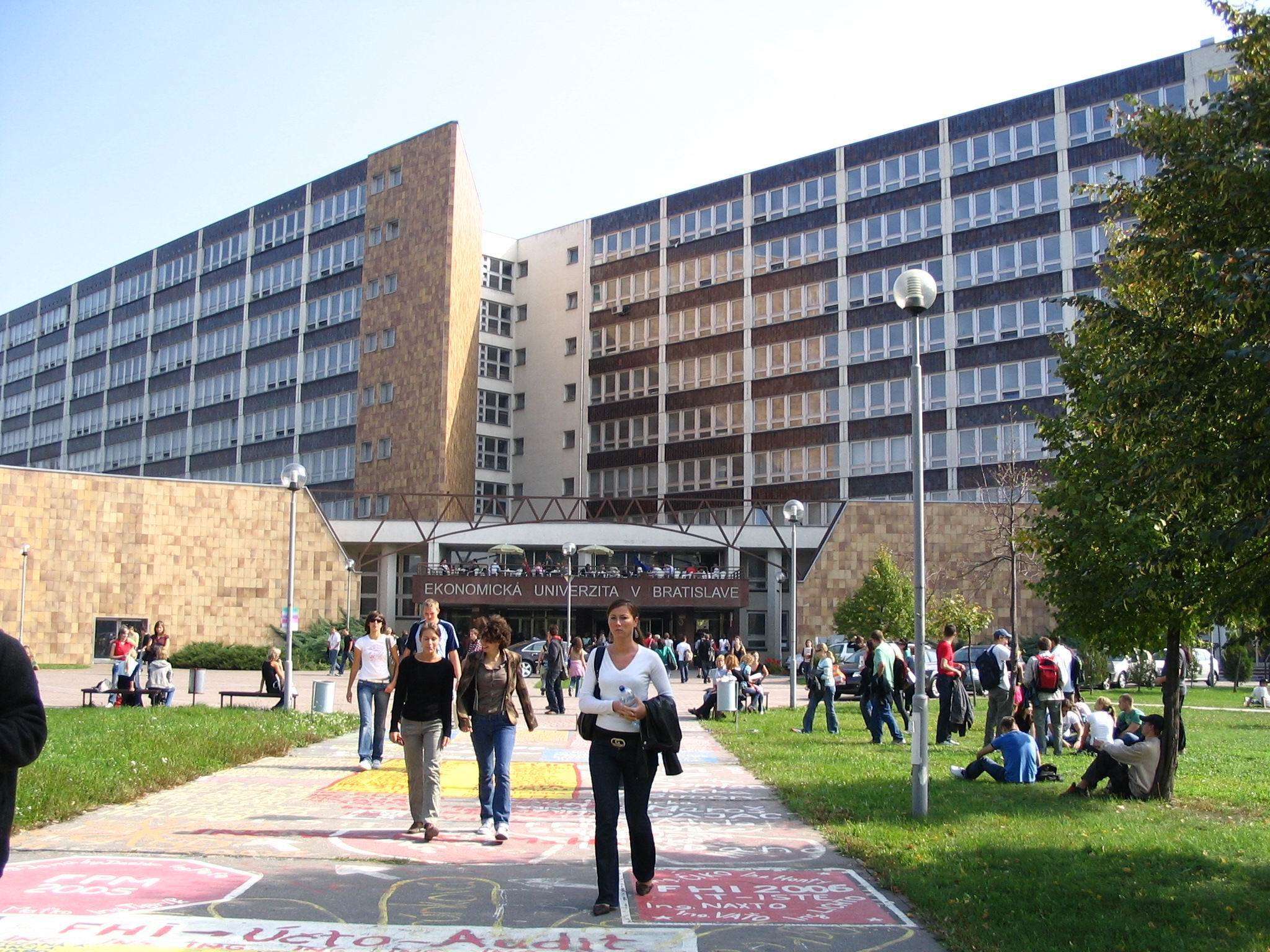
Main Building hall of Economics in Bratislava at Dolnozemská

The Faculty of International Relations (Slovak: Fakulta medzinárodných vzťahov Ekonomickej univerzity v Bratislave, FMV EU) is the second youngest and second smallest faculty of the University of Economics in Bratislava.

== History ==
The Faculty of International Relations of the University of Economics in Bratislava is one of the university's seven faculties. It was established by the Rector's Decree of January 17, 2000.

== Mission ==
The main objective of the Faculty of International Relations (Fakulta medzinárodných vzťahov – FMV, the Faculty) is to raise and prepare well-trained and educated professionals for contemporary and especially future demands of social, economical and political life in Slovakia. Graduates of the Faculty shall be capable to orientate themselves in the field of International Political Affairs, International Legal Affairs and International Economic Relations. They are required to command fluently two world languages and shall be capable of communicating freely in another foreign language. Research, publishing, project task solving, corporate business and other activities are closely interlinked with the main mission of the Faculty and provide favorable conditions for its fulfillment and multiply its impacts.

== Description ==
The school offers bachelor's, master's and doctoral programs in international economic relations and economic diplomacy. Graduates are expected to work in the field of foreign service, international organizations, media, transnational corporations, etc. According to recent surveys, the graduates of the Faculty of International Relations rank top ten in Slovakia in mean income and employment.

The School has approximately 600 students (all three levels combined) and around 35 teaching staff (with a PhD.), bringing the student:teacher ratio to 17. Students are offered courses in economic, political, cultural and security studies. Mandatory courses are complemented by various elective units, including courses taught in English, German, Spanish, French and Russian. Every year, around 6% of the student body take an exchange semester abroad, bringing the total percentage of students with an international experience (over the 5 years it takes to complete a bachelor's and a master's) to almost 30%.

One of the greatest strengths of the Faculty of International Relations is its foreign languages program, where students enjoy the possibility of taking three foreign languages simultaneously for 5, 7 and 8 semesters respectively. The foreign language offer includes English, German, Spanish, French, Italian, and Russian, as well as Chinese and Arabic.

== Departments ==
• Department of International Economic Relations and Economic Diplomacy,

• Department of International Political Relations,

• Department of International Law.
