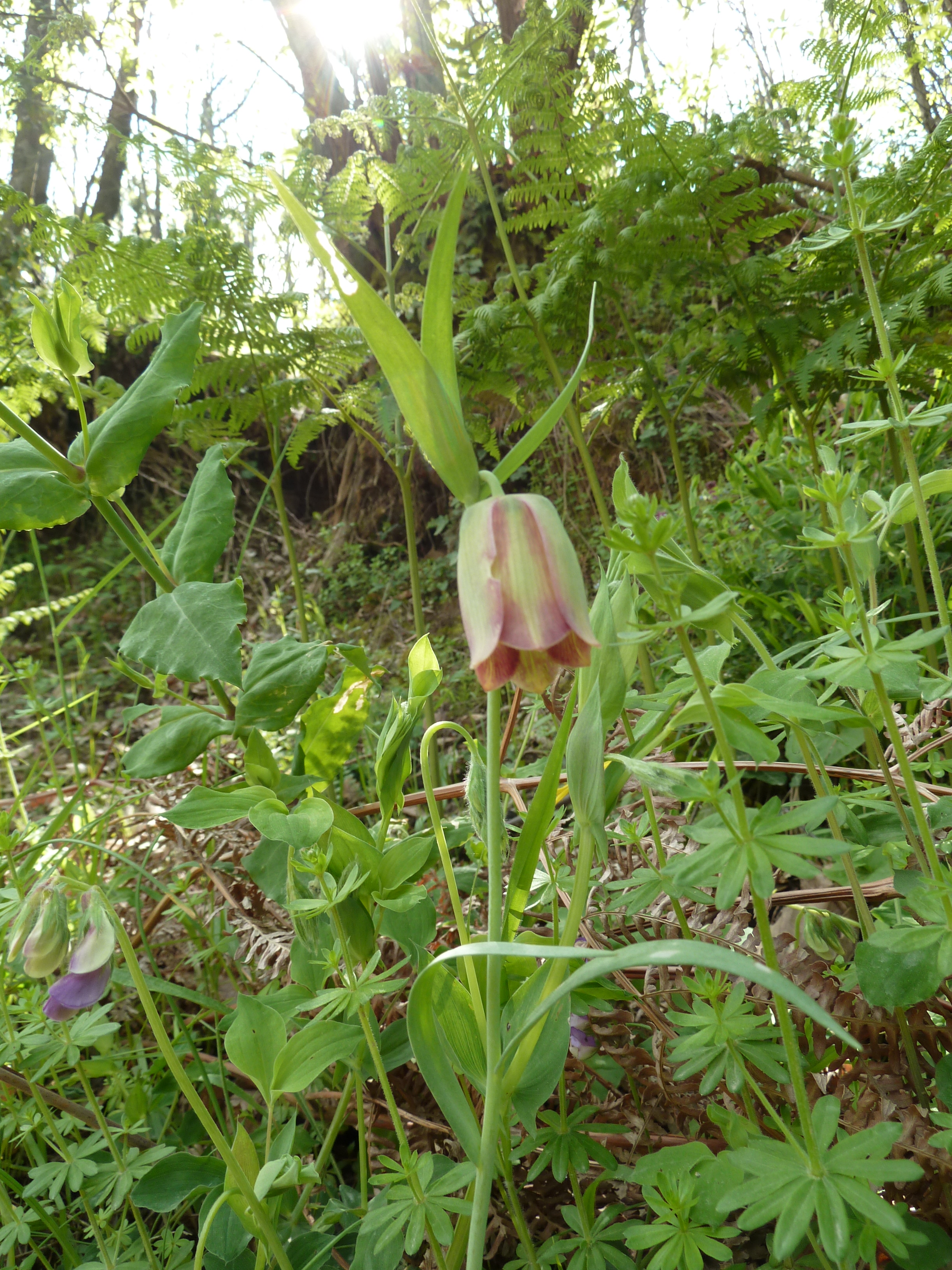

Conservation status
- Data Deficient (IUCN 3.1)

Scientific classification
- Kingdom: Plantae
- Clade: Tracheophytes
- Clade: Angiosperms
- Clade: Monocots
- Order: Liliales
- Family: Liliaceae
- Subfamily: Lilioideae
- Genus: Fritillaria
- Species: F. gussichiae

Binomial name
- Fritillaria gussichiae (Degen & Dörfl.) Rix

Synonyms
- Fritillaria graeca var. gussichiae Degen & Dörfl.

= Fritillaria gussichiae =

Species of flowering plant

Fritillaria gussichiae is a European plant species in the lily family Liliaceae, native to Bulgaria, North Macedonia, Serbia, Albania, and Greece.

The plant was once considered part of Fritillaria graeca but more recent studies suggest it is a distinct species more closely related to Fritillaria pontica.
