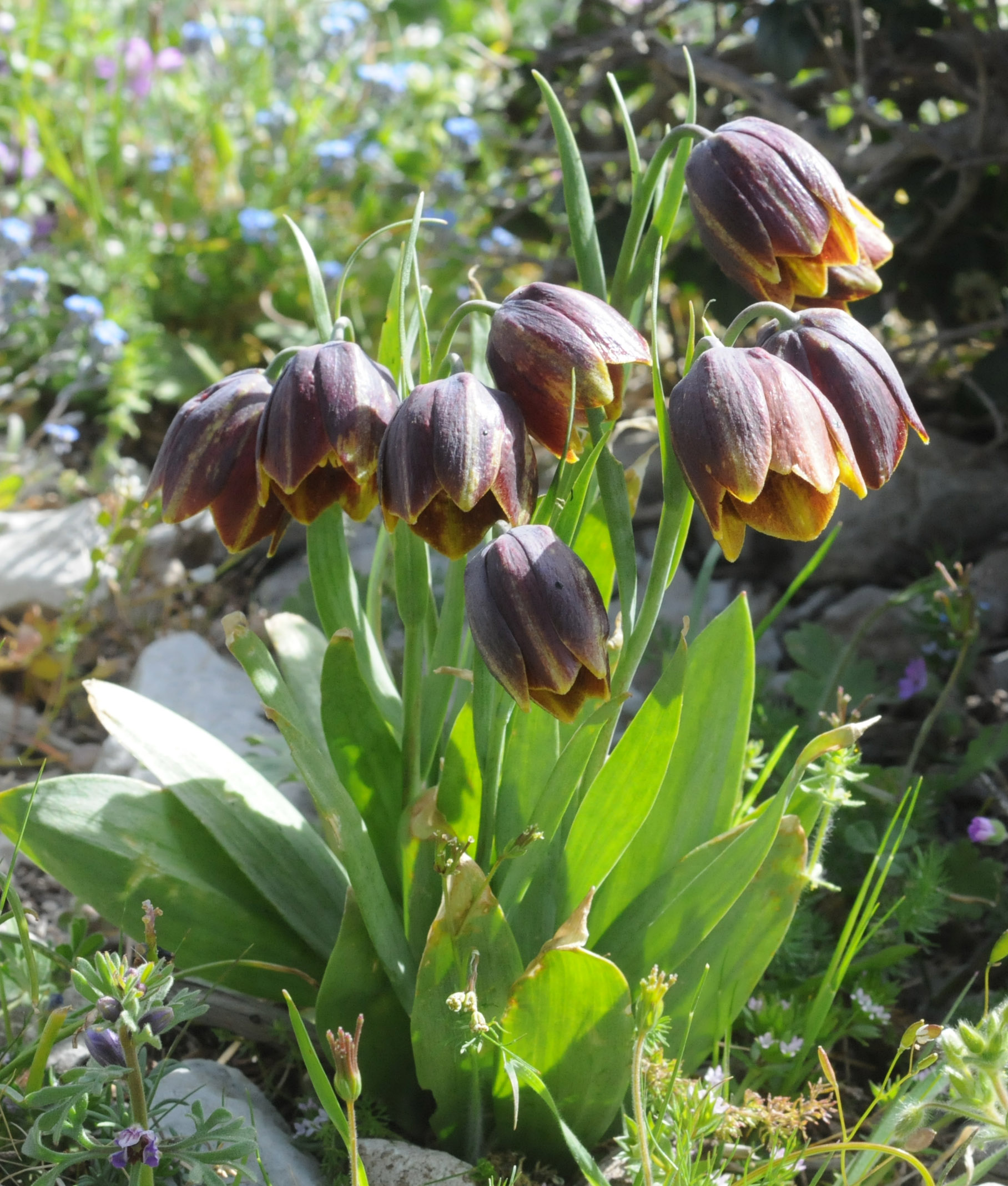

Conservation status
- Least Concern (IUCN 3.1)

Scientific classification
- Kingdom: Plantae
- Clade: Tracheophytes
- Clade: Angiosperms
- Clade: Monocots
- Order: Liliales
- Family: Liliaceae
- Subfamily: Lilioideae
- Genus: Fritillaria
- Species: F. rhodocanakis

Binomial name
- Fritillaria rhodocanakis Orph. ex Baker

= Fritillaria rhodocanakis =

Species of plant

Fritillaria rhodocanakis is a species of plant in the lily family Liliaceae. In its pure form, it is found only on Hydra Island (also called Ydra or Hydrea or Ύδρα) and on small neighboring islands in Greece . Additional populations occur in the Peloponnisos region of mainland Greece, though the specimens there show some degree of hybridization with F. spetsiotica and F. graeca. In 1987, some of the hybrids were described with the name Fritillaria rhodocanakis subsp. argolica, but this is now generally referred to as Fritillaria × spetsiotica Kamari.

Fritillaria rhodocanakis is a bulb-forming herbaceous perennial. The flowers are nodding and pendent, each tepal purple with a yellow tip.

The species is listed as endangered by the IUCN. As of 2020, there were 500 mature individuals of the species with a stable conservation trend.

== Distribution and habitat ==
Fritillaria rhodocanakis is confined to the island of Hydra (Idra) and a few smaller islets in the Argolic Gulf, where it grows in open limestone terrain. It favours phrygana (low, bushy Mediterranean scrub), clearings in Pinus halepensis (Aleppo pine) woodland, and even the margins of olive groves or vineyards, often beneath scattered shrubs. Because its entire range is limited to a handful of rocky outcrops and cultivated slopes, the species is classified as Vulnerable in the Red Data Book of Rare and Threatened Plants of Greece and Least Concern on the IUCN Red List (2017); it is protected under the Bern Convention, Annex II of the EU Habitats Directive (92/43/EEC) and Greek Presidential Decree 67/81.

== Cytogenetics and hybridisation ==
Like most Greek Fritillaria, F. rhodocanakis is diploid (2n = 24), with its chromosome complement made up of two metacentric (centromere near the middle), two submetacentric (centromere slightly off-centre), eight subtelocentric and ten telocentric chromosomes. Two of the telocentric pairs bear minute satellites on their short arms, and secondary constrictions adjacent to the primary centromere further distinguish marker chromosomes. In zones of overlap on the Argolis Peninsula it hybridises freely with the related endemics F. spetsiotica and F. graeca, producing cytologically intermediate plants that may carry extra "B-chromosomes" or, in some populations, exist as triploids (2n = 3x = 36), underlining ongoing gene flow and karyotype variability within this narrow contact area.
