= Balkan Botanic Garden of Kroussia =

Greek botanical garden

- BBGK
- Βαλκανικός Βοτανικός Κήπος Κρουσσίων
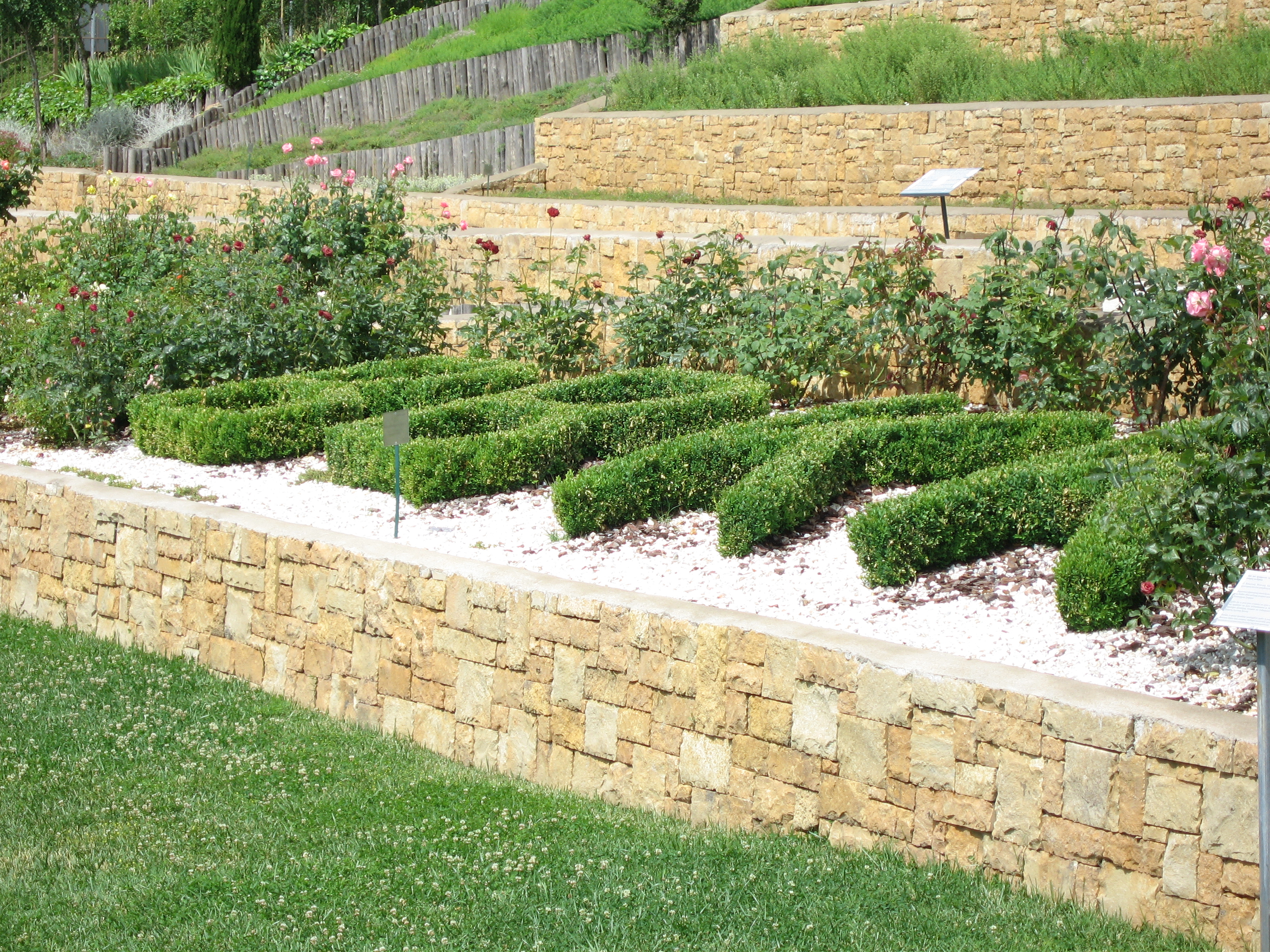
- The entrance to BBGK
- Interactive map of Balkan Botanic Garden of Kroussia
- Type: Hellenic botanic garden
- Nearest city: Thessaloniki
- Nearest town: Pontokerasia
- Coordinates: 41°05′N 23°06′E
- Area: 31 hectares (77 acres)
- Elevation: 600 m (2,000 ft)
- Established: 19 May 2001

The Balkan Botanic Garden of Kroussia (BBGK) is a botanical garden in northern Greece that was funded by the Inter-Regional Developmental Initiatives of the European Union (INTERREG II-External Borders). It was founded May 19, 2001, as an initiative of the Hellenic Agricultural Organization "Demeter". It is a member of the Botanic Gardens Conservation International (BGCI) and National Network of Hellenic Botanic Gardens. The research and services of BBGK are supported by the Laboratory of Protection and Exploitation of Native and Floricultural Plants located at Thermi of Thessaloniki.

== Location ==
BBGK is situated in northern Greece, about 70 km from Thessaloniki, near the mountain village of Pontokerasia in the Prefecture of Kilkis. It is located close to the borders of Greece, North Macedonia and Bulgaria, lying between two important conservation areas included in the Natura 2000 Network: Lake Kerkini and the Mouries hydrophilous lake forest.

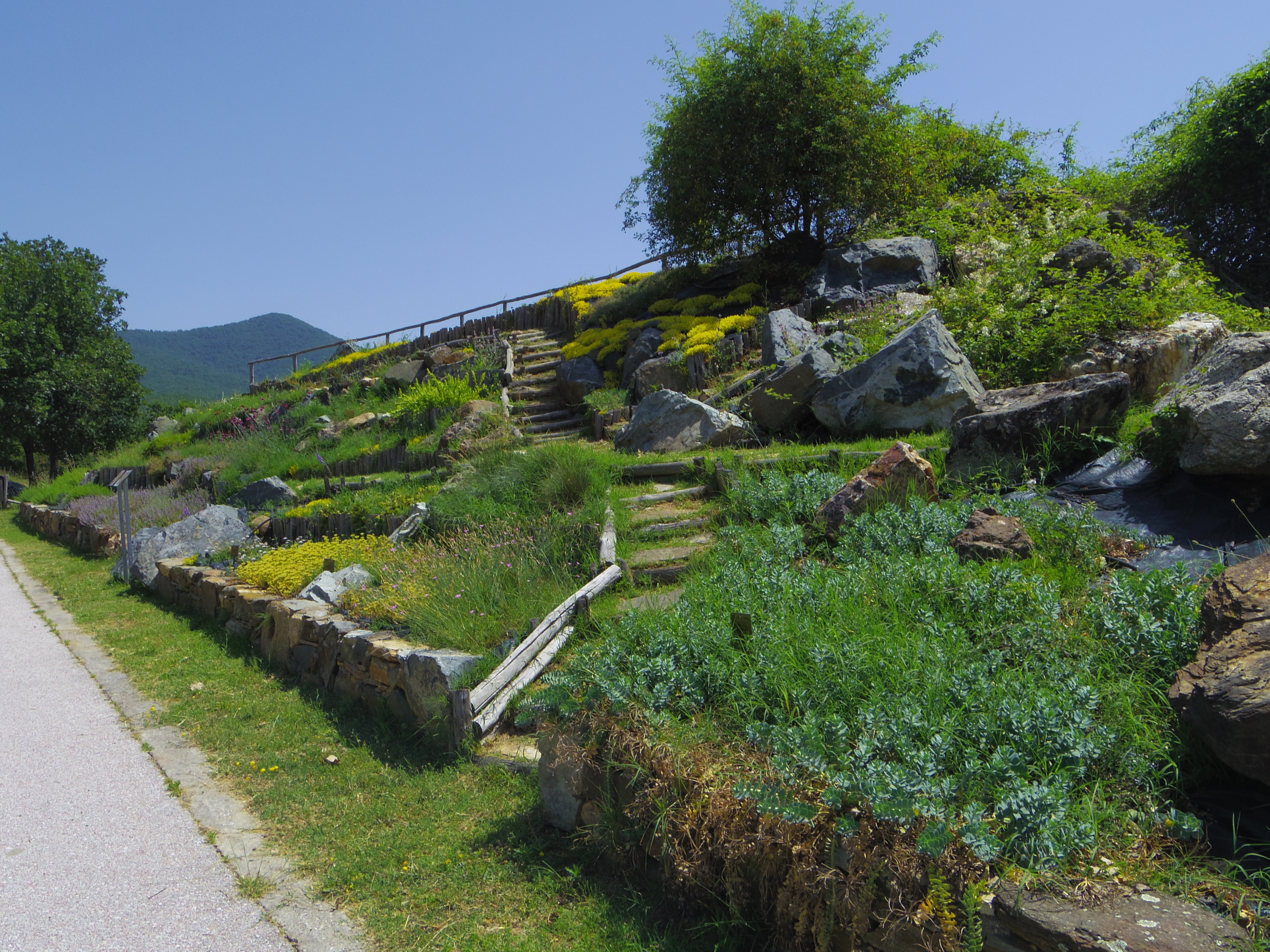
Thematic Garden with Balkan alpine flora.

== Description ==
The BBGK has been developed within a deciduous oak forest (Quercus pubescens and Q. frainetto) that has been traditionally managed for a long time, at an altitude of 600 m (2,000 ft) (Mount Mavrovouni, Kroussa Mountain Range). Today it covers an area of 31 ha (77 acres) which is dedicated to the combined ex situ and in situ conservation of native plants of Greece and the Balkans (15 ha (37 acres) and 16 ha (40 acres), respectively), as well as to raising the environmental awareness of and educating the public.

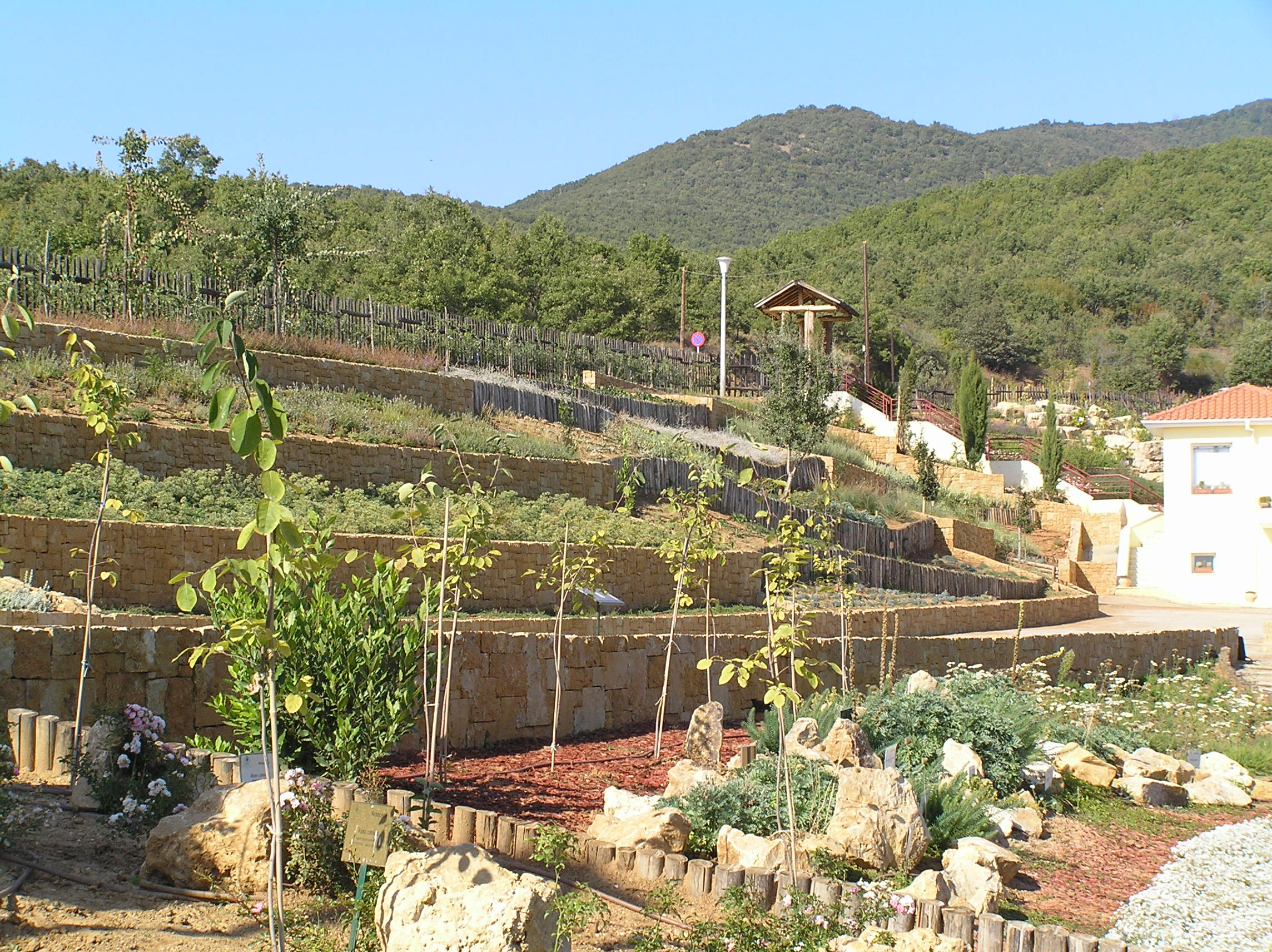
The Garden of Senses in 2004.

It hosts exclusively indigenous plant species and subspecies of Greece which correspond to islands, rugged mountain peaks, forests, to rocky slopes and meadows, valleys, to beaches or riverbanks and lakes of the territory.

Visitors can walk through the periodic and permanent exhibition area, enjoy the open and close kiosks for resting, admire the view from the birdwatching areas and have a picnic. There is an entrance fee for the guided tour as well as a small shop with products from the garden. BBGK is open all year round for visitors and on demand for guided tours and events.

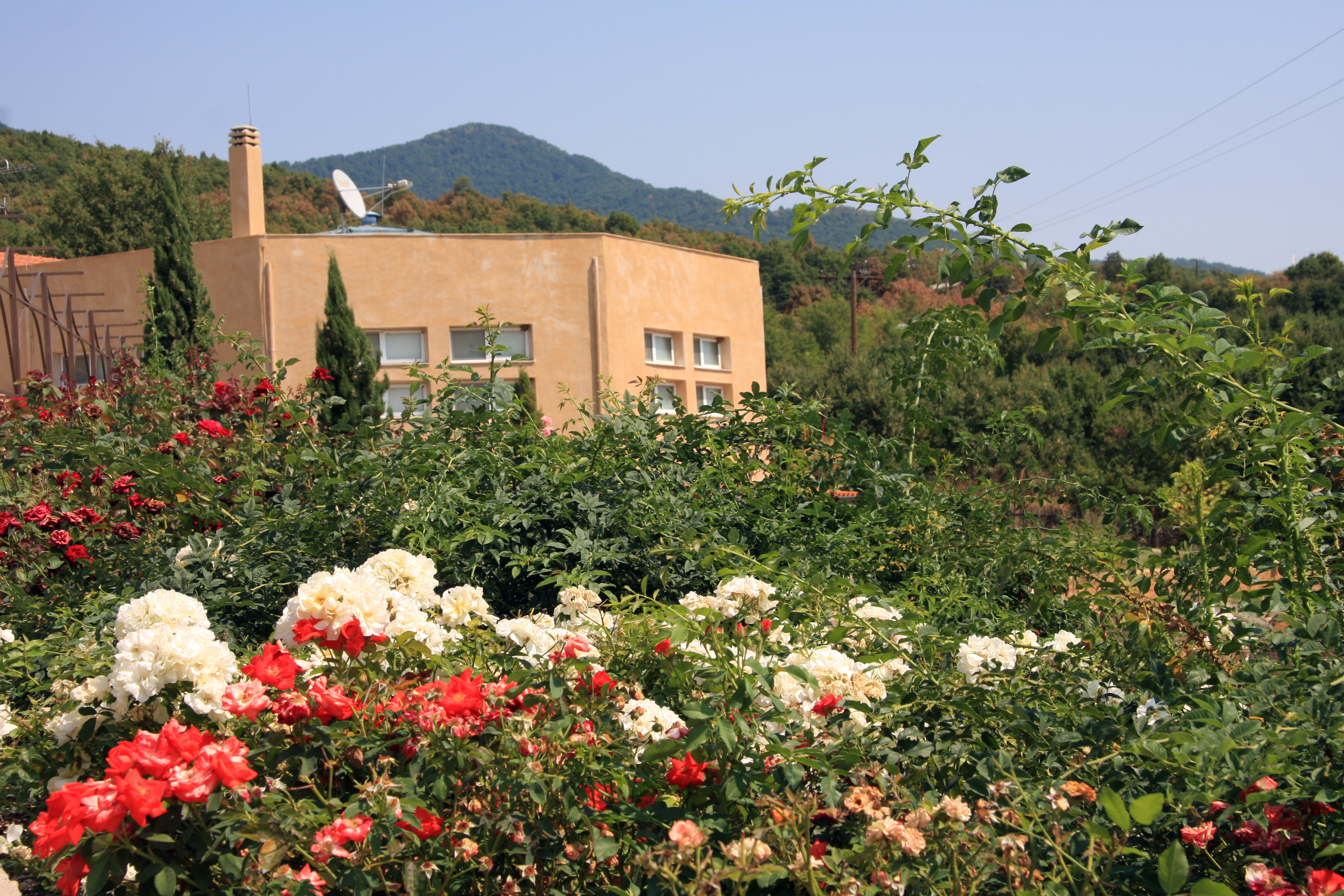
The building where educational activities and exhibitions are organized

Moreover, visitors can make a guided tour on the various thematic paths where the plants are organized into various modules that serve scientific, research and educational purposes. Signage and maps are available in Greek and English, The BBGK is composed of two basic areas, the Garden of the Senses and the main Conservation Area. Almost half of the BBGK’s territory is a natural oak forest and at least 300 wild growing plant taxa thrive there and their populations are being conserved along with their habitats (in situ conservation).

Since its establishment in 2001, there has been a continuous increase in visitor numbers and to date the BBGK receives about 10,000 visitors per year, of which 40% are schoolchildren, students or teachers.

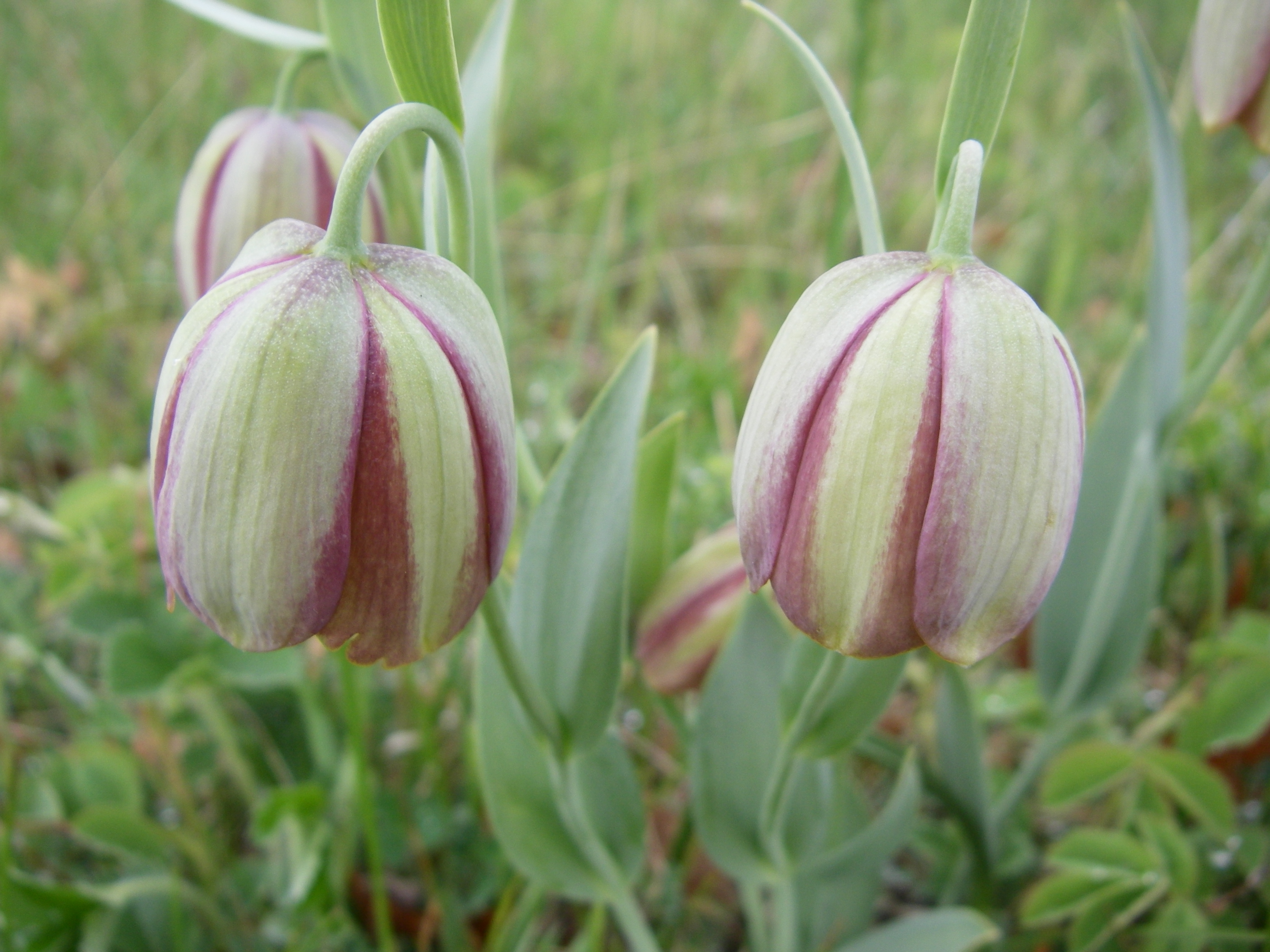
Fritillaria pontica, the symbolic plant of BBGK in the garden.

== Symbolic Plant ==
The BBGK’s symbol-plant is Fritillaria pontica due to the wild populations discovered in the grounds. This plant has been adopted as a symbol for its recognized ornamental value, its restricted general distribution area (Balkan countries and northern Turkey), its uncommon occurrence in Greece and its protection by the Greek Presidential Decree 67/81.

== Conservation Policy and Outcomes ==
The Balkan Botanic Garden of Kroussia (BBGK) has formulated a clear conservation strategy with specific policies and has adopted the mission to “support research, maintenance, propagation, evaluation, conservation and sustainable use of the native plants of Greece and the Balkans, combined with raising the environmental awareness of the public”.

BBGK works with a nursery and laboratory located in Thermi, the Laboratory for the Conservation and Evaluation of Native and Floricultural Species (LabCENFS). This facility is where propagation, experimentation, and analysis of the BBGK's plants occur.

The BBGK has been focused on the conservation and the sustainable use of the native plants of Greece and the Balkans, with a policy against planting exotic ornamental plants. All 40 plant displays in BBGK have been created using plant material originating in the wild that has been sustainably managed and put through a ‘domestication procedure’ in the man-made environment of the botanic gardens. All mother plant material is associated with explicit information regarding its collection in the wild i.e. geographical coordinates and site description (specific location, region, prefecture and country). No accession number is given to plant collections with poor documentation. Habitat information is also documented in situ for each individual accession collected (substrate, soil type, forest zone, habitat type, slope, altitude). Additionally, in many cases GIS are used to unveil the natural species-specific ecological preferences of conservation priority plants. This procedure represents the BBGK’s ‘explicit plant documentation’ policy.

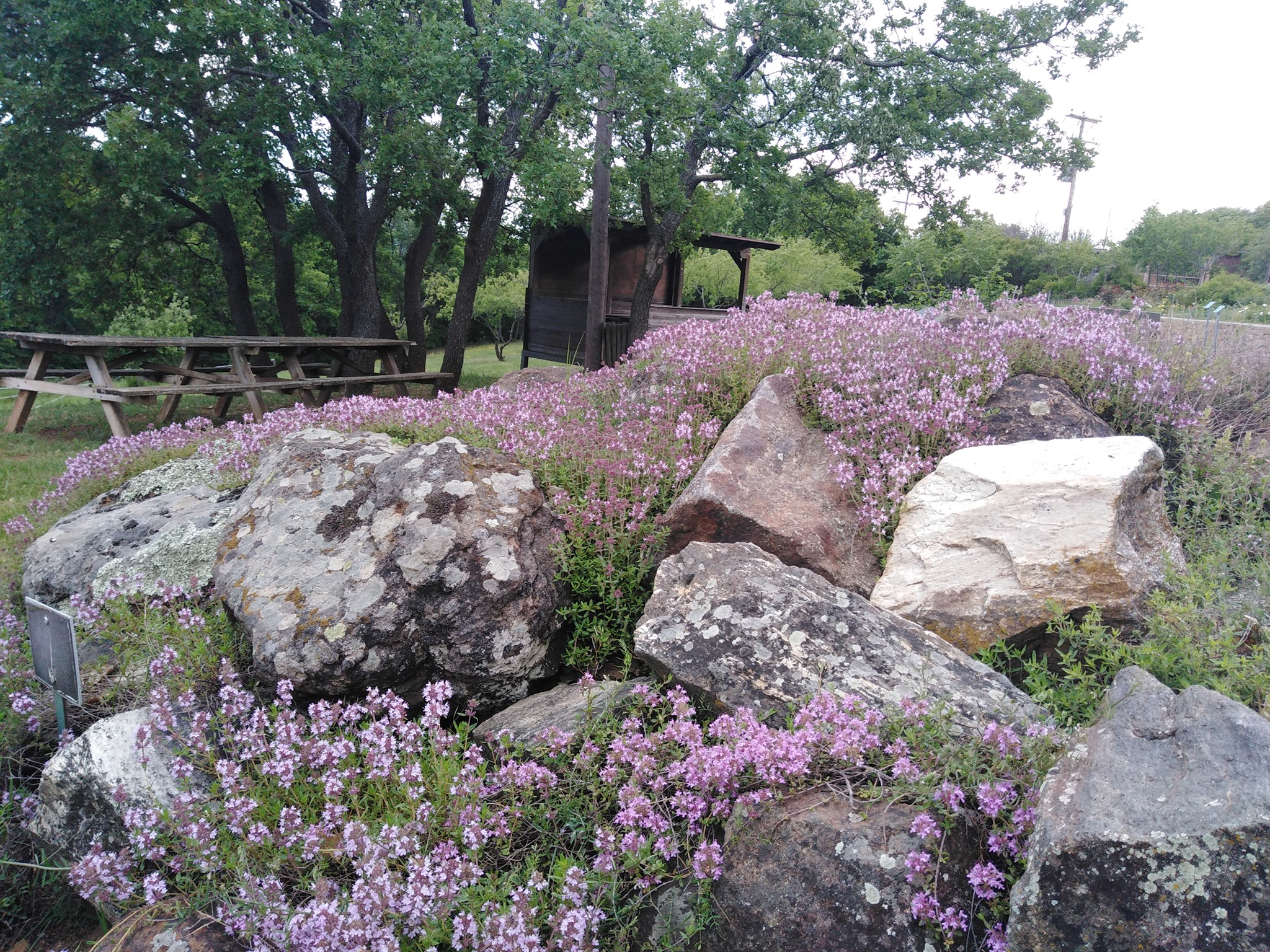
Hellenic Thyme Rockery

To document the genetic identity of different accession numbers and to facilitate identification of the uniqueness of specimens, possible sustainable exploitation of selected accessions, accurate plant documentation, traceability, access and benefit sharing policies, the ‘DNA barcoding policy’ is applied with selected molecular markers. As of 2019, more than 130 plant collecting expeditions have been organized in all phytogeographical regions of Greece and more than 2,800 accessions of propagation material (seeds, bulbs, rhizomes, cuttings, living individuals) have been collected from the wild. This corresponds to 1470 taxa (> 22% of Greek flora). BBGK prioritises Greek endemic plants with a narrow distribution, Balkan endemic plants with a narrow distribution, endemic plants to the collective region of the Balkans, western Turkey and parts of Italy, other rare plants found in Greece, and native plants with aromatic-medicinal properties, agroalimentary interest, ornamental-floricultural or breeding potential (e.g. crop wild relatives), or socioeconomic value.

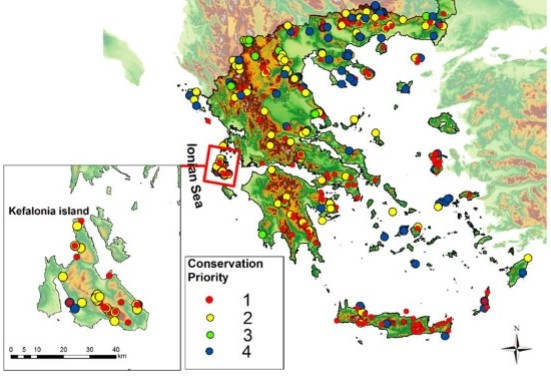
Distribution of the Greek native Important Plant Species (IPS) accession numbers (wild propagation material) collected by the BBGK.

Between 2001–2016, about 150 Greek endemics have been successfully propagated, but recent efforts have been intensified and over 300 taxa (20% of all Greek endemics) are currently found under ex situ conservation.

== See also ==
- Botanic Gardens Conservation International
- Kilkis
