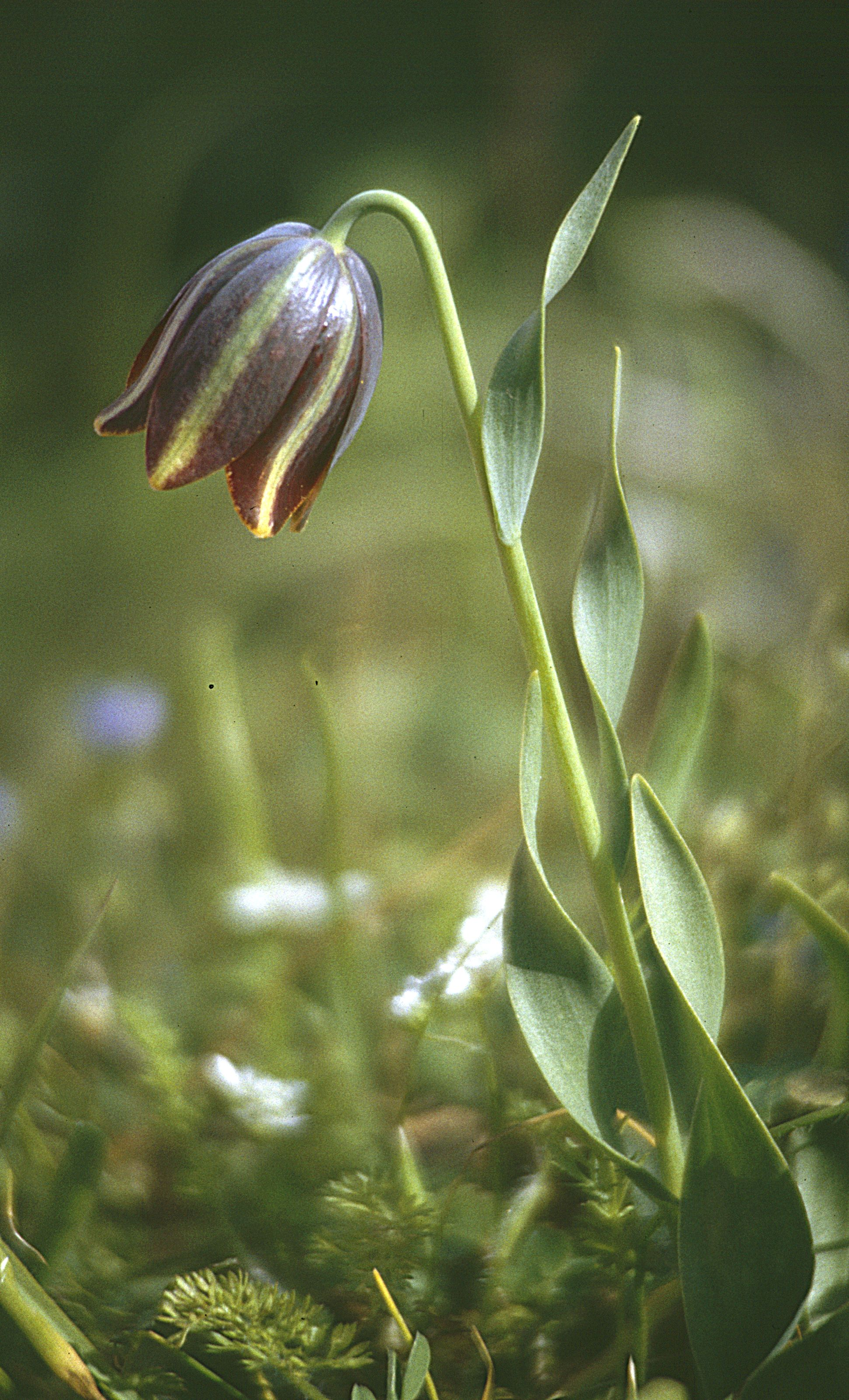

Scientific classification
- Kingdom: Plantae
- Clade: Tracheophytes
- Clade: Angiosperms
- Clade: Monocots
- Order: Liliales
- Family: Liliaceae
- Subfamily: Lilioideae
- Genus: Fritillaria
- Species: F. graeca

Binomial name
- Fritillaria graeca Boiss. & Spruner

Synonyms
- Fritillaria graeca var. guicciardii (Heldr. & Sart.) Boiss.; Fritillaria graeca var. unicolor Halácsy; Fritillaria guicciardii Heldr. & Sart.; Fritillaria zahnii Heldr.

= Fritillaria graeca =

Species of flowering plant

Fritillaria graeca is a European plant species in the family Liliaceae. It is native to Albania, Bulgaria, North Macedonia, and Greece. Some older literature says that the plant can also be found in Serbia, but all these collections are of var. gussichiae, now regarded as a distinct species called Fritillaria gussichiae.

Fritillaria graeca has flowers with red and white stripes which resemble small bells – one on each stem. It blooms between April and May. It reaches a height of around 25 cm (9.8 in).

Subspecies

- Fritillaria graeca subsp. graeca – eastern + southern Greece including Crete
- Fritillaria graeca subsp. thessala (Boiss.) Rix – Albania, Bulgaria, North Macedonia, northern Greece

formerly included

- Fritillaria graeca var. gussichiae, now called Fritillaria gussichiae
- Fritillaria graeca var. skorpili, now called Fritillaria skorpili
