= Fritillaria skorpili =

Scientific classification
- Kingdom: Plantae
- Clade: Tracheophytes
- Clade: Angiosperms
- Clade: Monocots
- Order: Liliales
- Family: Liliaceae
- Subfamily: Lilioideae
- Tribe: Lilieae
- Genus: Fritillaria
- Species: F. skorpili

Binomial name
- Fritillaria skorpili Velen.

Synonyms
- Fritillaria graeca var. skorpili (Velen.) Stoj. & Stef.

Species of flowering plant

Fritillaria skorpili is a European plant species in the lily family Liliaceae, native to Bulgaria.
