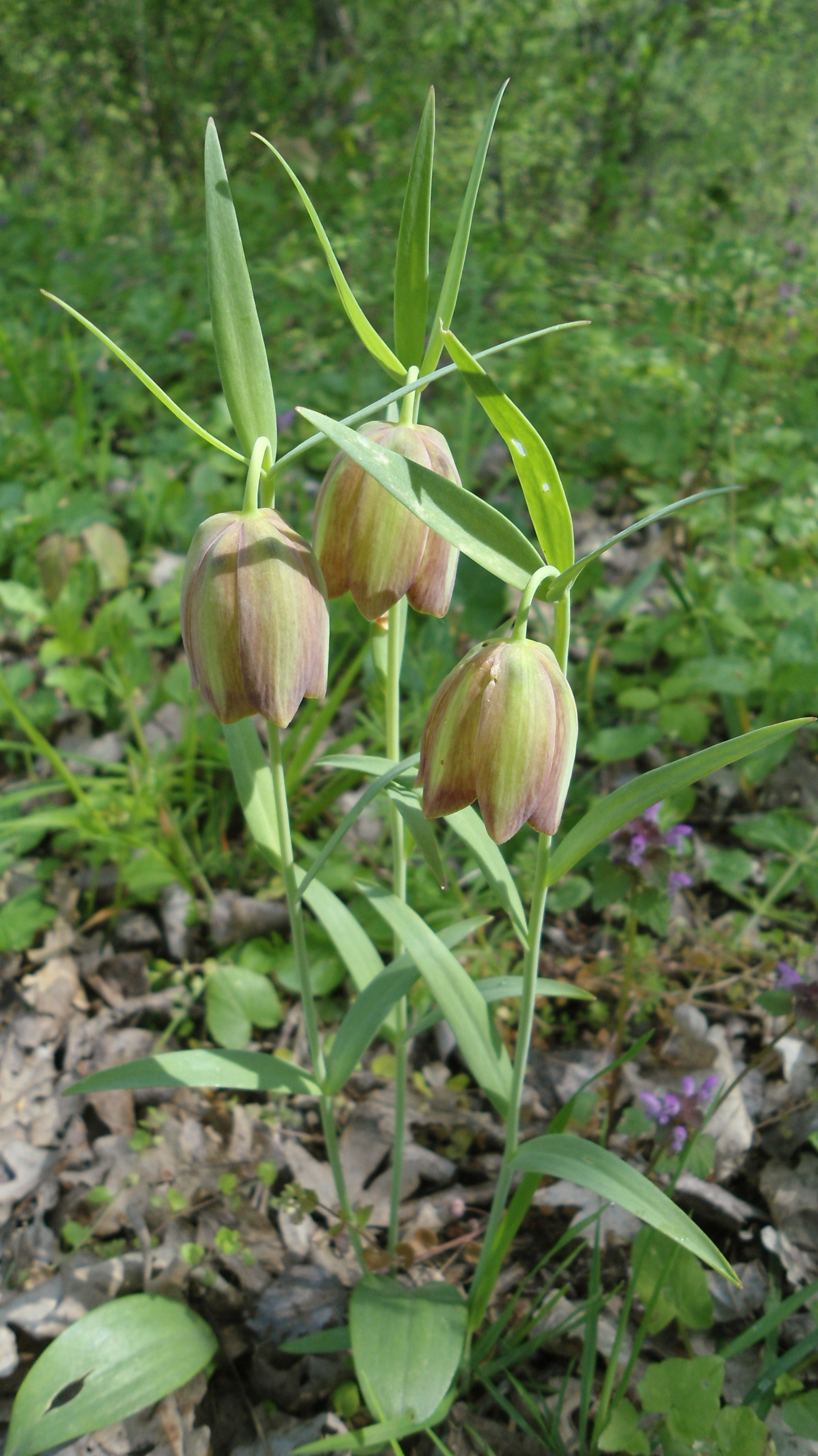
- Each flower has three prominent bracts.

Scientific classification
- Kingdom: Plantae
- Clade: Embryophytes
- Clade: Tracheophytes
- Clade: Angiosperms
- Clade: Monocots
- Order: Liliales
- Family: Liliaceae
- Subfamily: Lilioideae
- Genus: Fritillaria
- Species: F. pontica

Binomial name
- Fritillaria pontica Wahlenb.

Synonyms
- List: Fritillaria olympica K.Koch; Fritillaria theophrasti Kamari & Phitos

= Fritillaria pontica =

Species of flowering plant

Fritillaria pontica, the Pontic fritillary, is a species of flowering plant in the genus Fritillaria native to the mountains of the Balkans, the Aegean Islands and Anatolia. Shade tolerant and easy to grow, it has gained the Royal Horticultural Society's Award of Garden Merit.

== Gallery ==
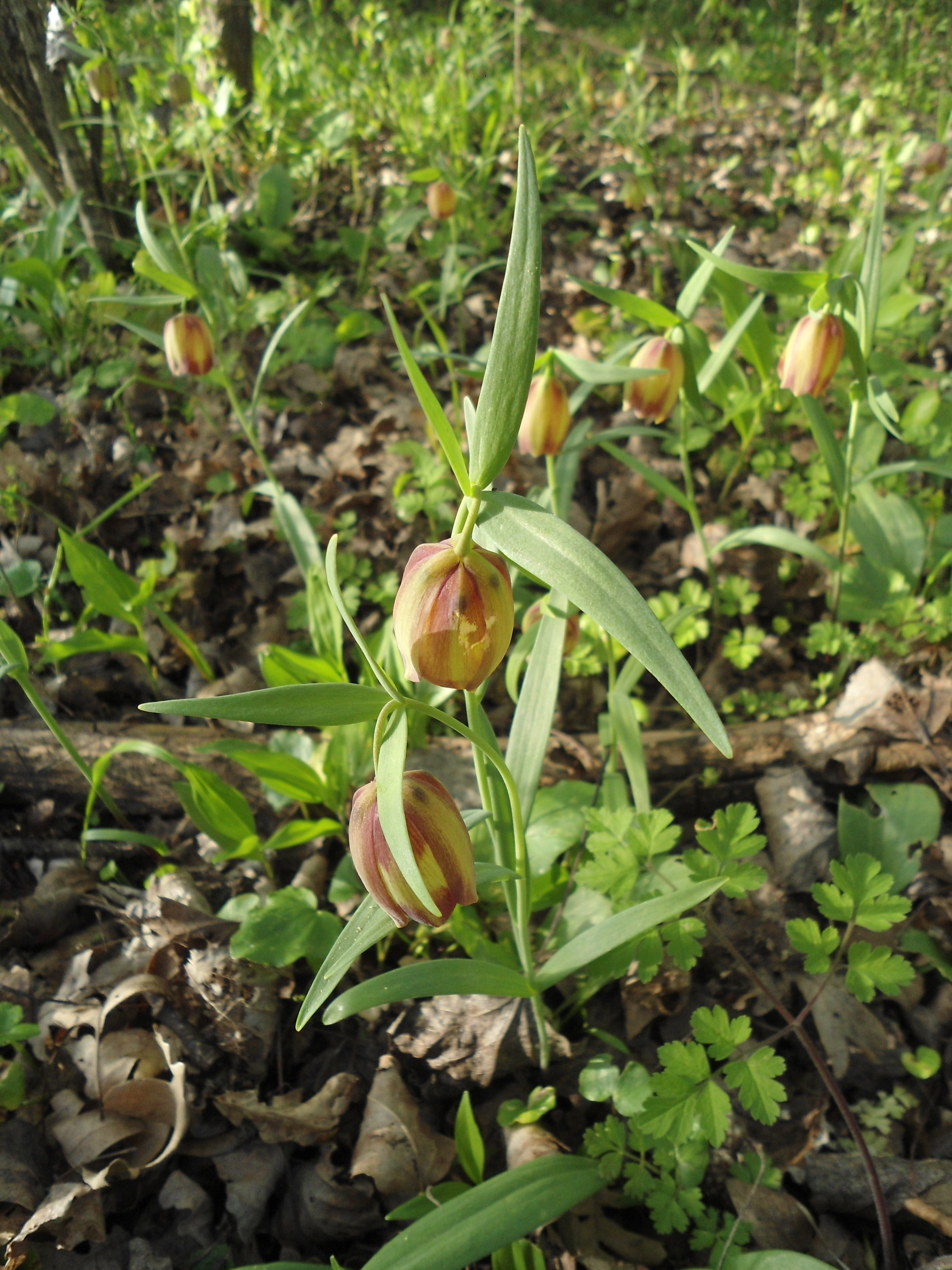
Plants

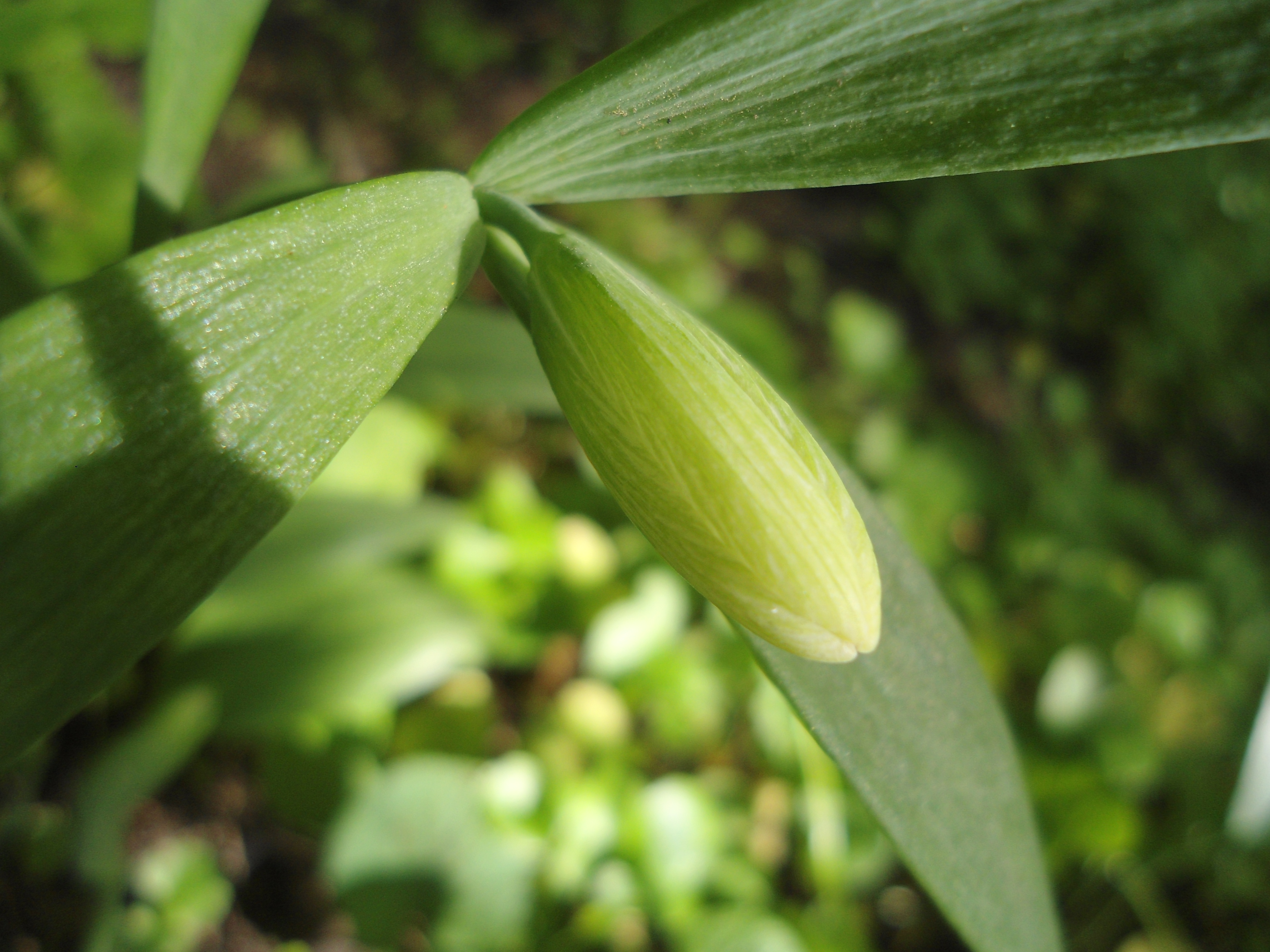
Bud

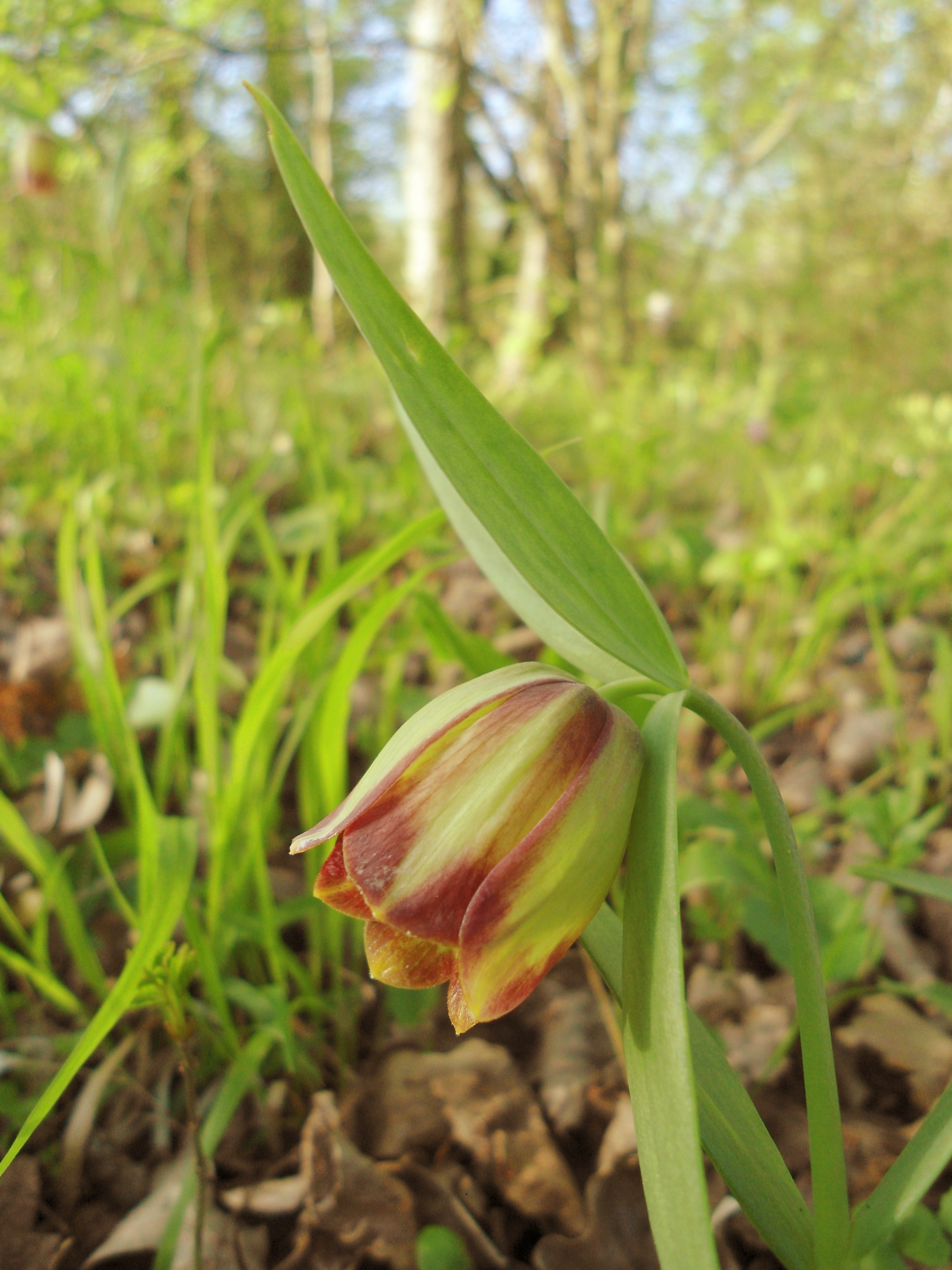
Flowers

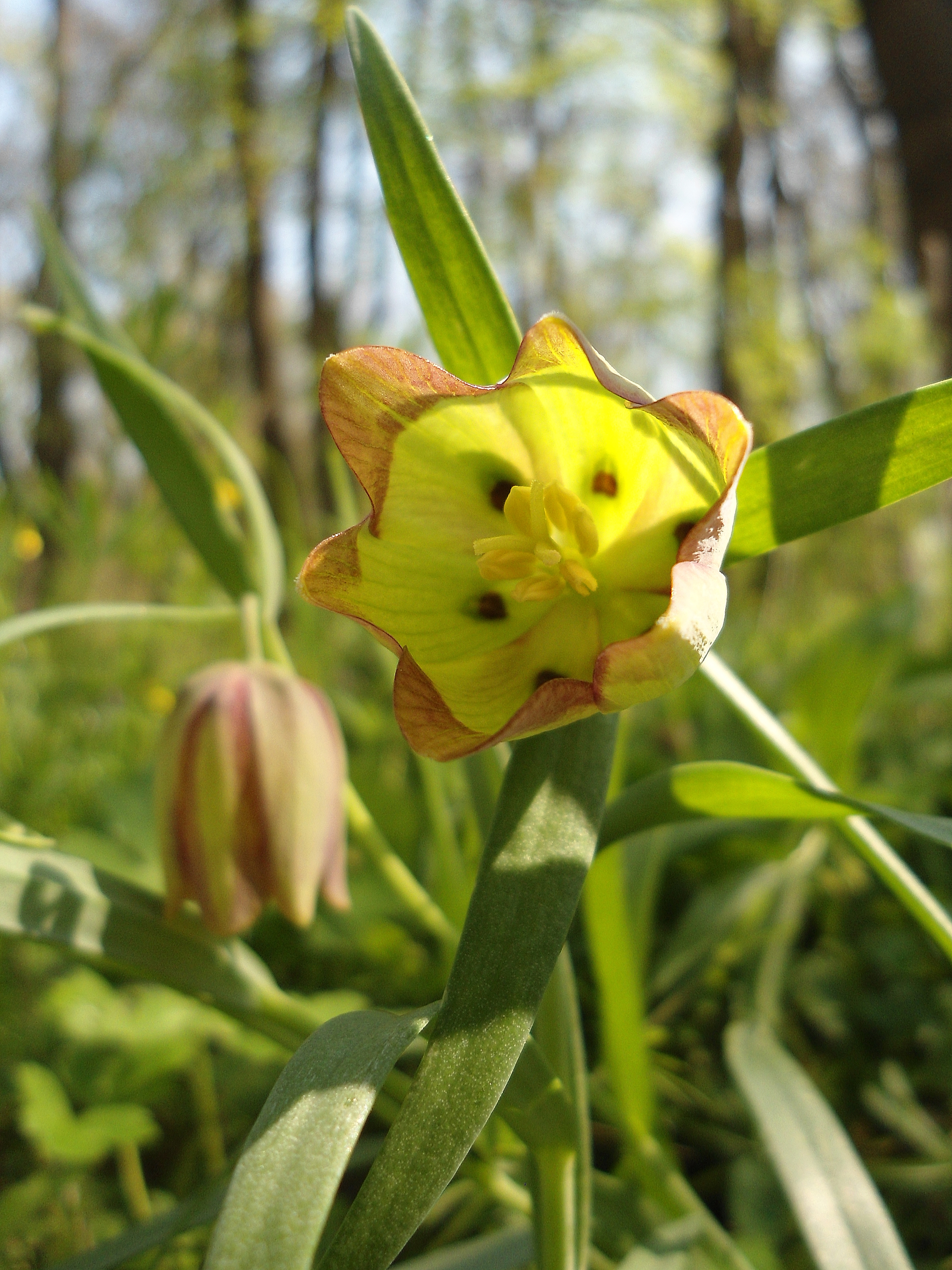
Flower

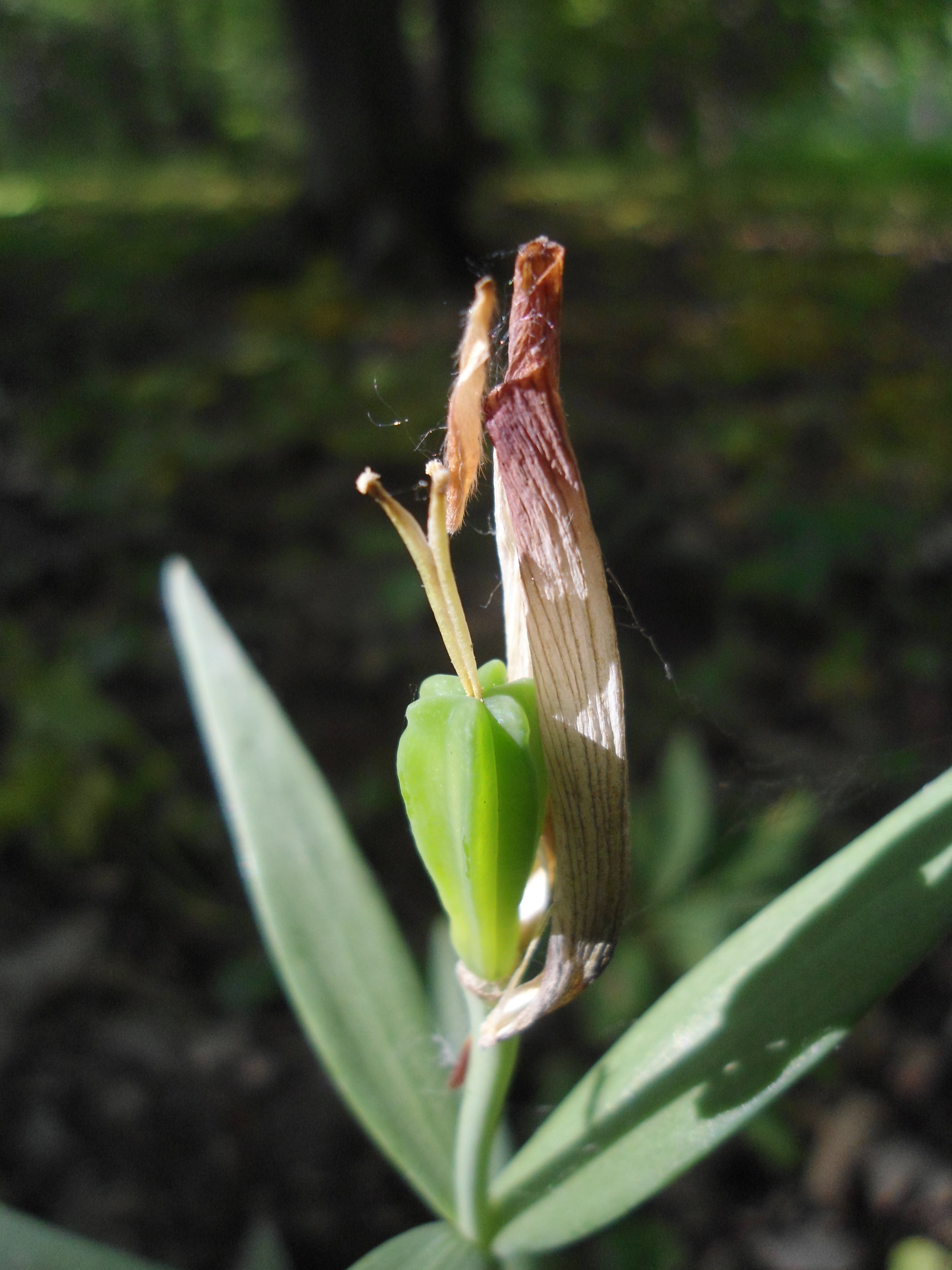
Fruit

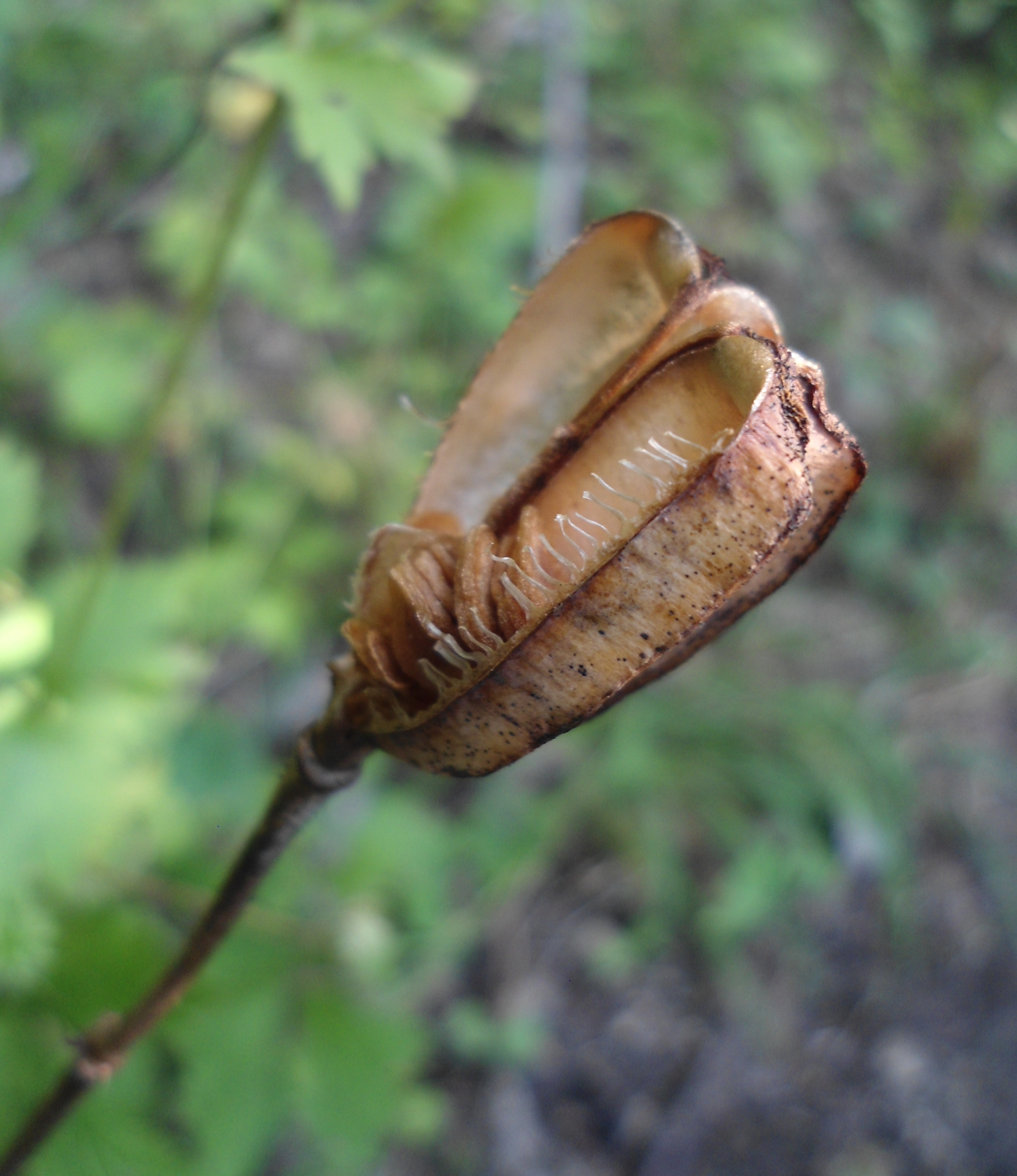
Open pod
