= Tornik (peak) =

Mountain in Serbia

Tornik peak
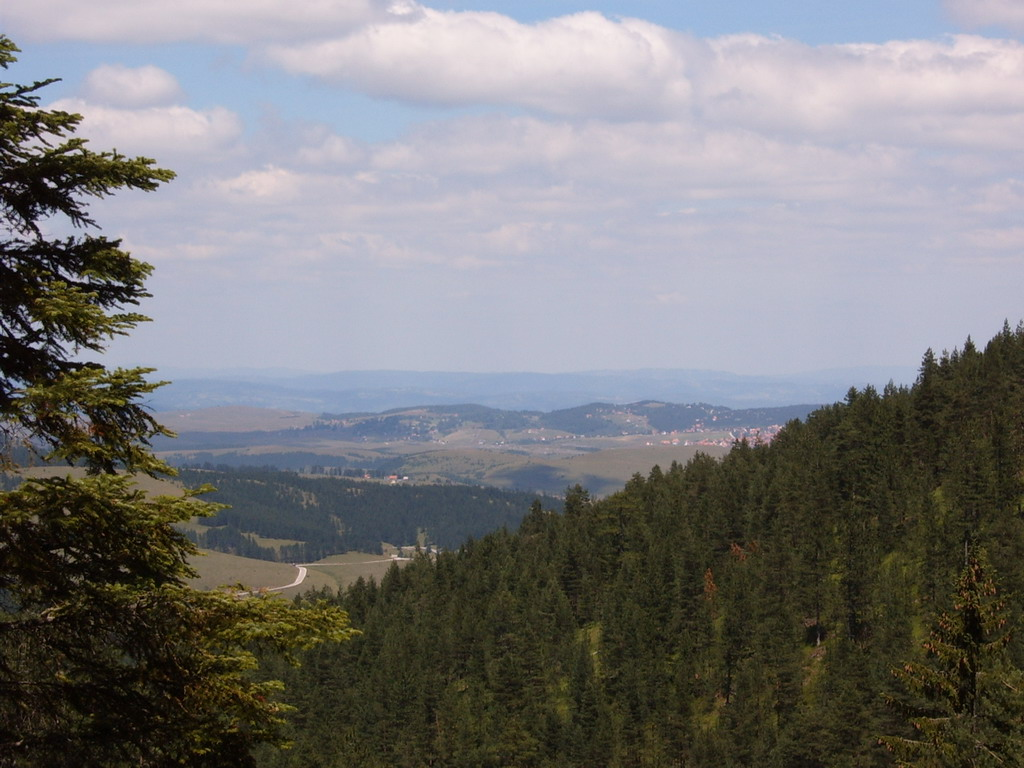
- The slopes of Tornik peak

Highest point
- Elevation: 1,496 m (4,908 ft)
- Coordinates: 43°39′15″N 19°38′19″E

Geography
- Location within Serbia
- Location: Western Serbia

Tornik (Serbian Cyrillic: Торник) is the highest point of the Zlatibor Mountains in the Zlatibor District in southwestern Serbia. It rises to an altitude of 1,496 m.

== Geography ==
Mount Tornik is located 10 km from the town of Zlatibor, the tourist centre of the Zlatibor Mountains. Nearby is the Ribnica Lake reservoir. It is surrounded by the villages of Jablanica, Stublo and Dobroselica.

== Tourism ==
At the foot of the peak is the Tornik ski resort, located at an altitude of between 1,110 and 1,490 m, with three runs. It is equipped with a gondola lift as well as several ski lifts. The resort was destroyed in the 1999 NATO bombing.
