= Stopića Cave =

Limestone cave in Serbia

- Serbian: Стопића пећина Stopića pećina
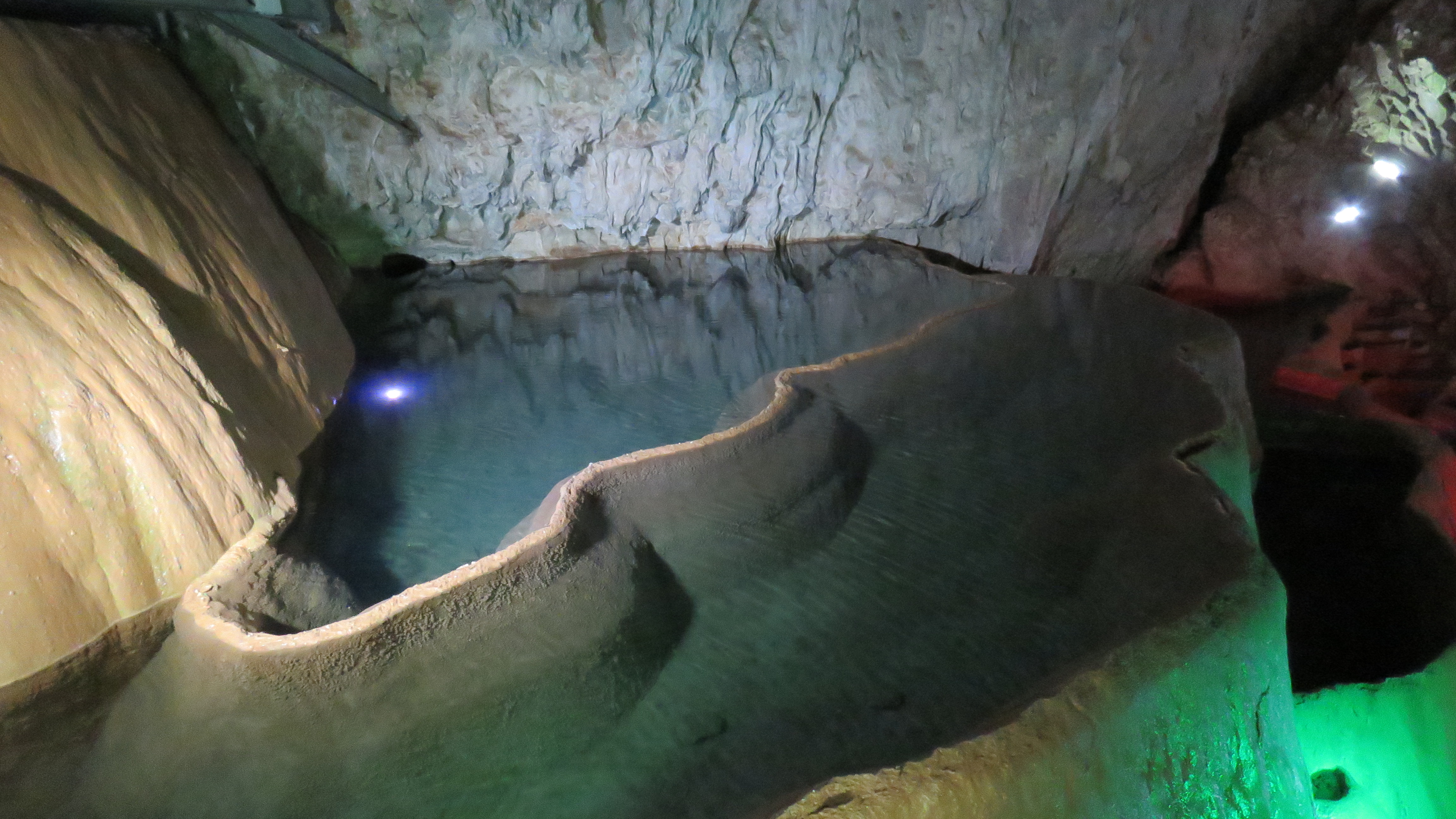
- Water filled cascading tufa "bathtubs"

- Location within Serbia
- Location: Sirogojno, Mount Zlatibor, Serbia
- Coordinates: 43°42′08″N 19°51′18″E
- Length: 1,691.5 m (5,550 ft)
- Geology: Triassic limestone
- Access: easy
- Show cave opened: 2009
- Show cave length: 400 m (1,300 ft)
- Visitors: >100,000 (2022)
- Features: waterfall, tufa bathtubs

The Stopića Cave (Serbian: Стопића пећина, romanized: Stopića pećina) is a limestone cave near Sirogojno, on the slopes of Mount Zlatibor in western Serbia. It has been protected by the state as a natural monument. By 2022 it became the most visited cave in Serbia.

== Location ==
The Stopića Cave is located on the territory of the Rožanstvo village. It is situated 19 km (12 mi) from Zlatibor, in the Sirogojno direction. The location where to turn from the road between two villages is marked by the representation of the large bottle, posted as the commercial for the former Vapa Spa.

== Geology ==
The cave is easily accessed. The cave entrance is 18 m (59 ft) tall and 35 m (115 ft) wide. It has a total length of 1,691 m (5,548 ft). It is a river cave, as the stream of Trnavski Potok flows through it. It was named after the nearby Stopići hamlet of the Rožanstvo village.

It contains a 9.5 m-tall (31 ft) waterfall called the "Spring of Life", speleothems and unusual tufa "bathtubs", cave formations which fill with water in time, and then overspill creating a cascade flow. In the section of the cave known as the River Canal, there is a whirlpool. Beneath it, the tufa slide is formed, which spreads into the tufa cascades. Between the cascades, the "bathtubs" and gigantic "pots" are located. During the higher influx of water, the cascading water forms the fully fledged "Spring of Life" waterfall.

It has two major halls, Dark Hall and Light Hall, and specific openings in the ceiling called dugure or vigledi. There are seven of them, but only one, 66 m (217 ft) deep, is directly connected to the cave. Others are interconnected with each other by the network of slanted corridors.

== Human history ==
Local population preserved myths of the unknown voices coming from dugure, falling into them, falling into the abyss when getting off the path and various other aberrations in the cave. It was used as the hideout by the local Serbian population, hiding from the Ottoman army during the First Serbian Uprising. Local population still claims that the corridors are much longer than officially measured.

Radoslav Vasović published first description of the cave in the 1901 manuscript of the Serbian Geology Society. The first speleological surveys were conducted in 1909 and 1913 by Jovan Cvijić.

Local hero Pane Stopić - a rugged veteran of the Balkans Wars as well as World War I - allegedly hid in the cave for over a decade, evading the Chetniks, the Yugoslav Partisans and the OZNA pursuers, during and after World War II. Stopić is said to have died at the age of 83 in the mid-1950s, and his body was found in a meadow near the cave.

At the turn of the 21st century, some of the local population tried to dig into the dugure, believing it contained hidden gold. Some thought it was the hidden treasure of the medieval Nemanjić dynasty, while others claimed it was gold hidden by the Chetniks during the war.

The cave was open for public in 2009. In had 61,280 visitors in 2017, and 89,113 in 2019. Due to the acoustics, concerts and performances are being held in the cave. In 2022, additional 60 m (200 ft) of pathways were arranged for visitors, bringing a total to 400 m (1,300 ft). That way, Dark and Light Hall, Spring of Life waterfall, Hall with Pots, and whirlpools, all became accessible. The number of visitors reached over 100,000.

== Vapa Spa ==
Vapa Spa (Бања Вапа, Banja Vapa), or Toša's Spa (Тошина Бања, Tošina Banja) is a former spa located close to the Rožanci-Sirogojno road and in the vicinity of the cave. Small Prištavica river flows through it, while there are two pipes where the water springs in the spa. It has been used for centuries by the local population who claimed it had healing properties (nerves, skin diseases, eyes).

The unfinished spa complex, designed in the castle style, is left to the elements, derelict and covered in overgrowth. Construction began by the local Toša Lazović (1914–1999; hence the spa's second name) in 1974 and continued until 1999. On the road, there is a large brick object, designed in the shape of a bottle, marking the turn to the spa. The complex is entered via a fenced concrete bridge through the semicircular built gate. There is another, even more derelict entrance which also consists of a small bridge and a gate.

The castle with towers and terraces is made of red façade bricks and was supposed to be a hotel and the central part of the complex. There are paved pedestrian paths around it, and a small pool next to the river. There are several other built bottle-shaped objects around the building. There are pipes built into each one of them, where the water was supposed to spring out. Lazović for a while bottled and sold the water, but the complex ultimately remained unfinished and in ruins.

== Gallery ==
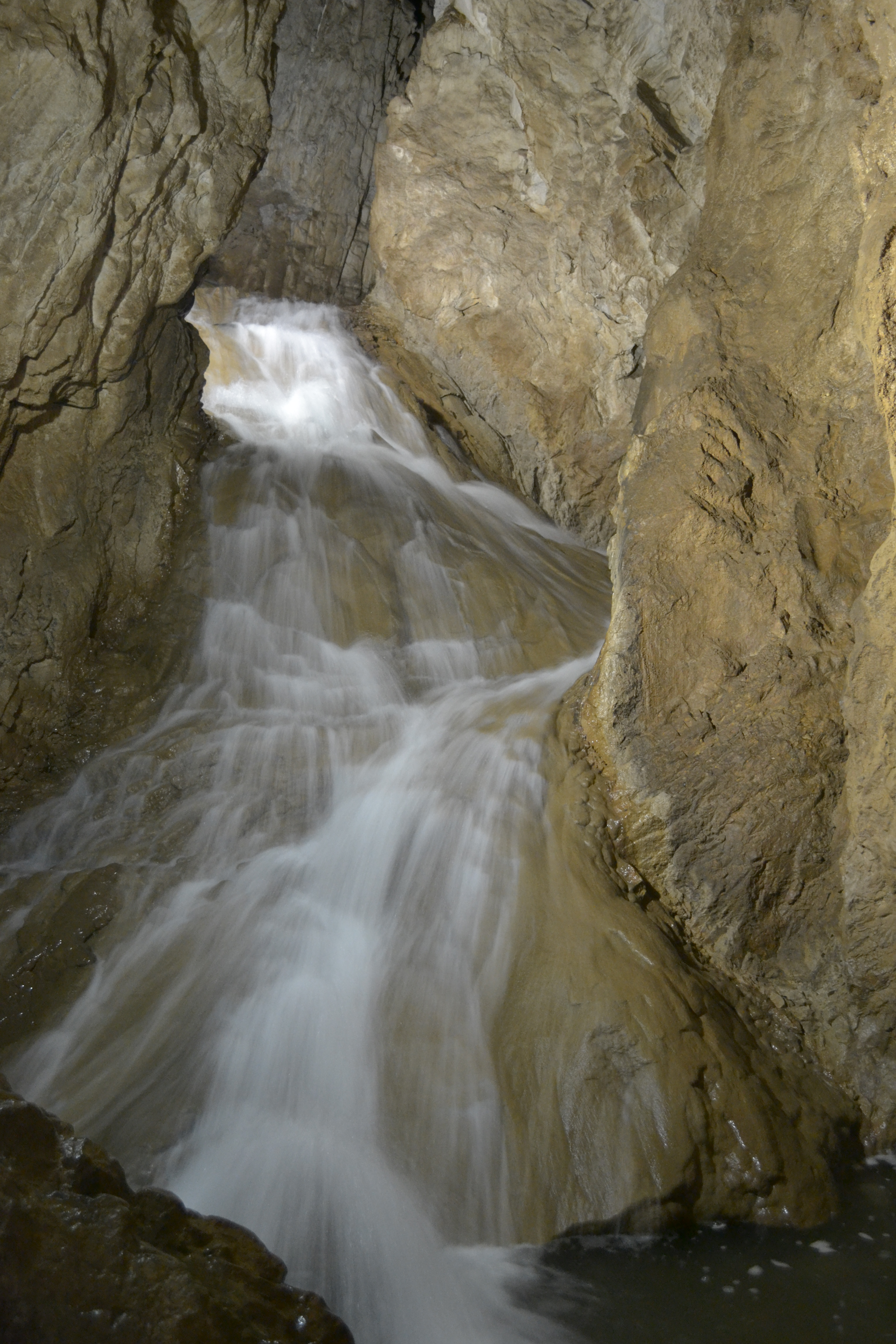

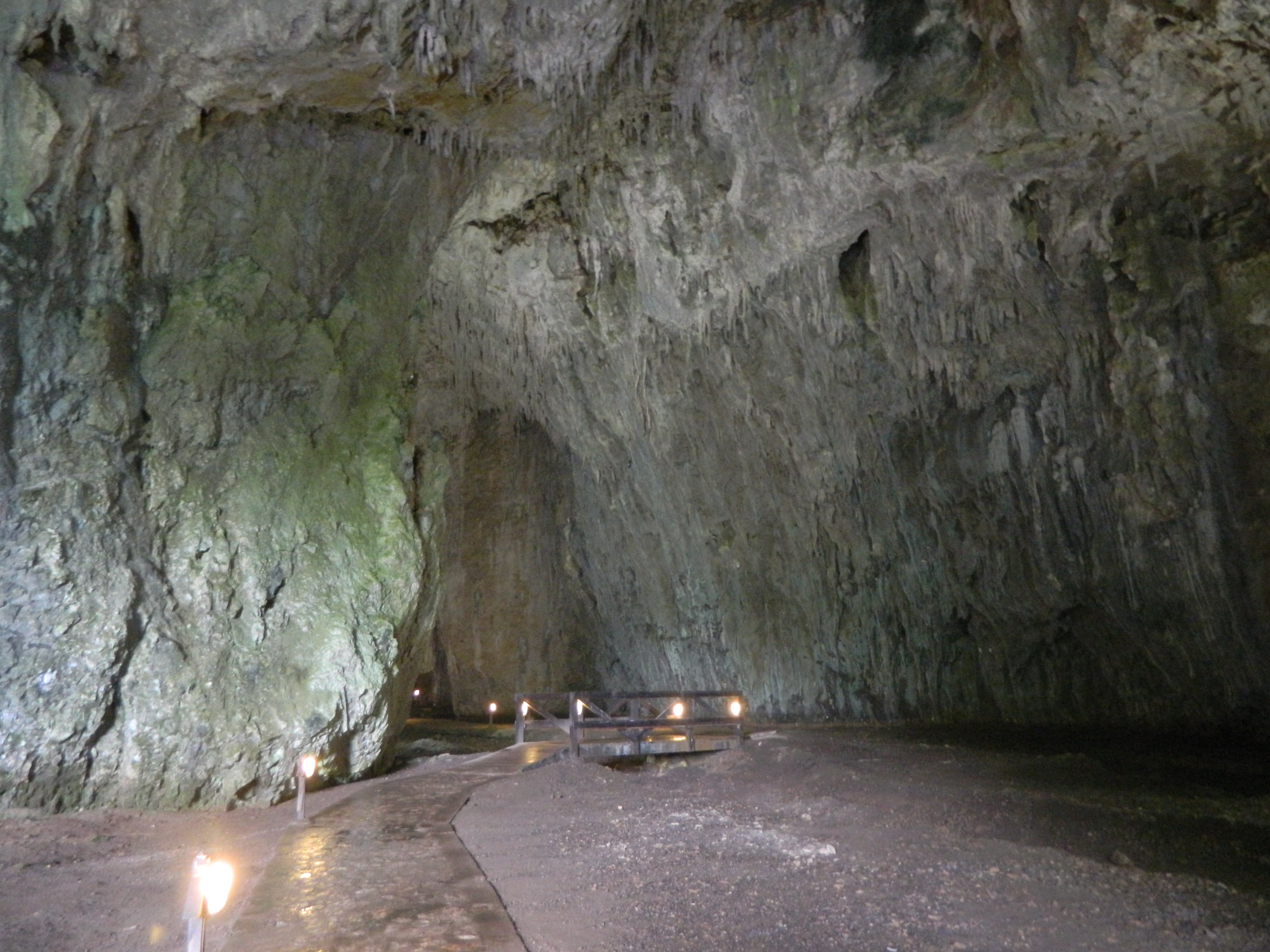

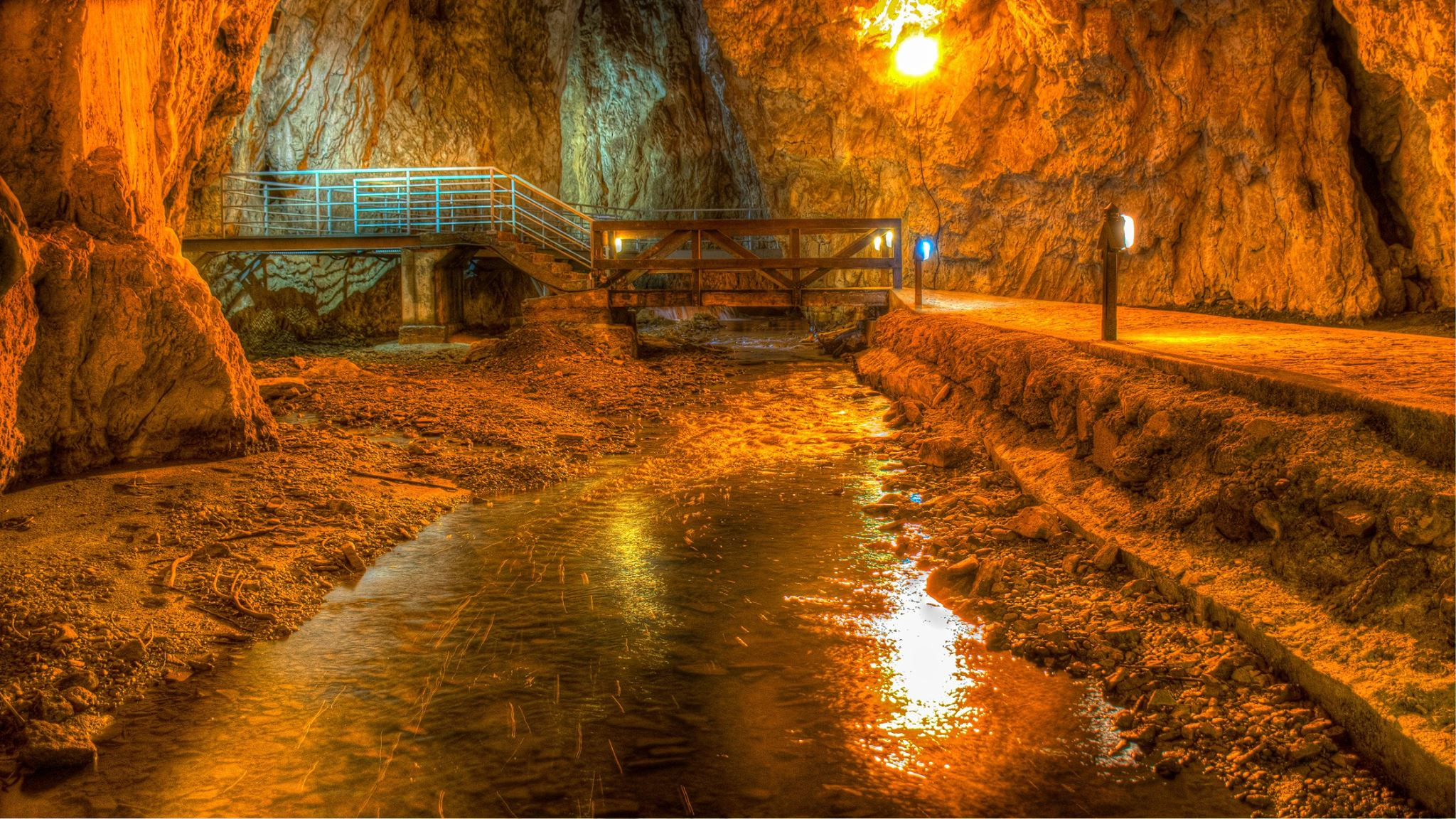

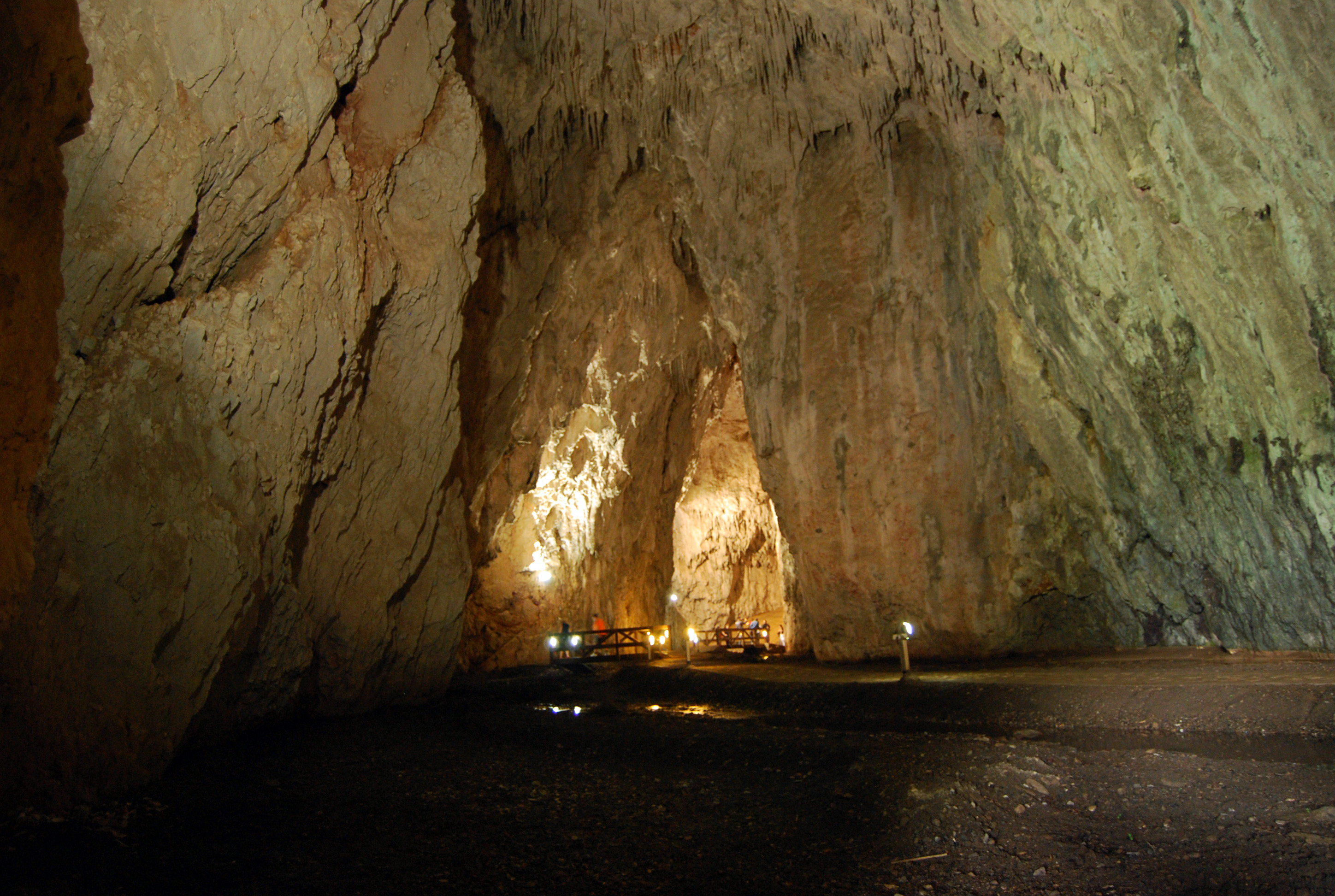

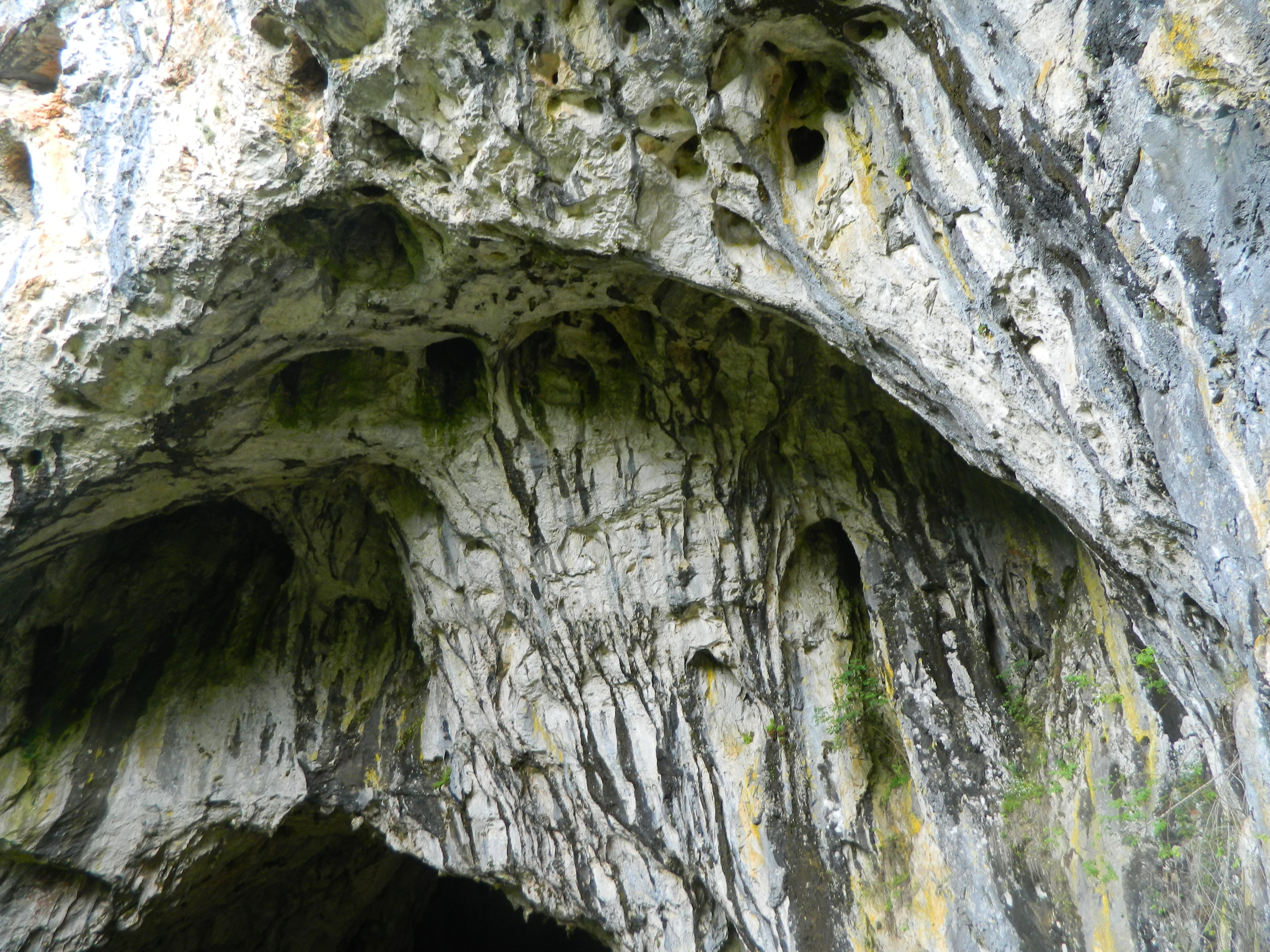

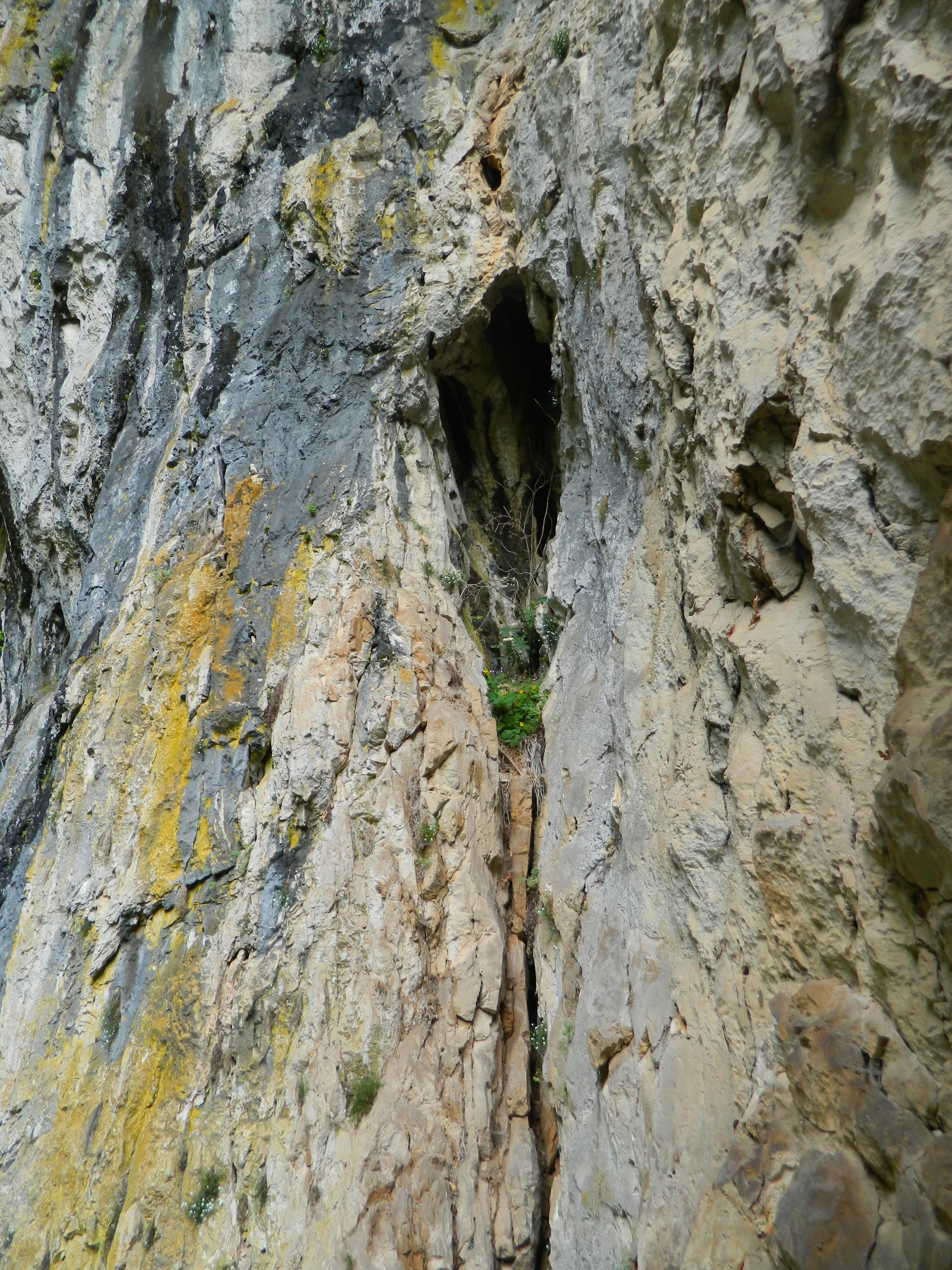

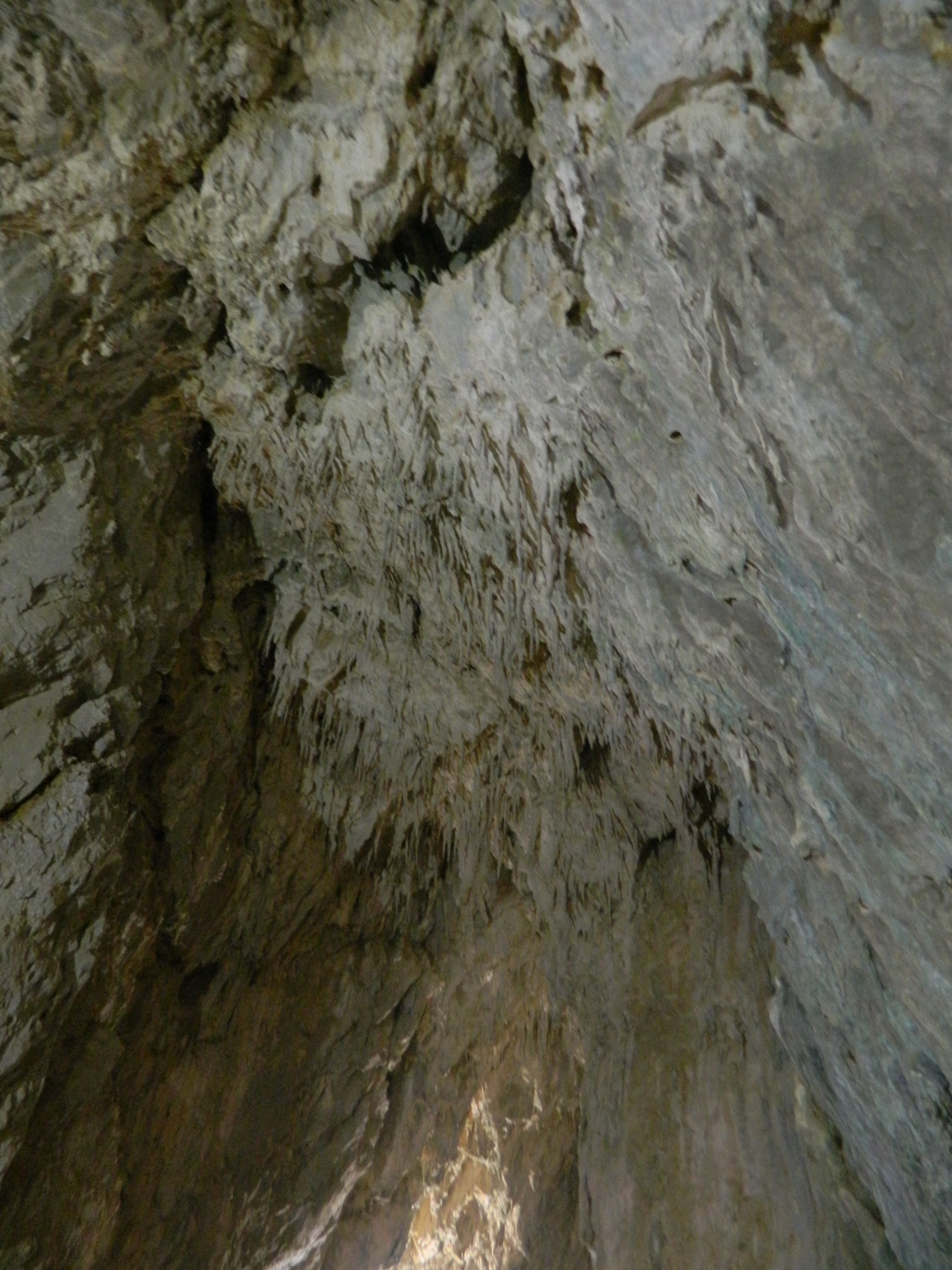

== See also ==
- List of caves in Serbia
- List of longest Dinaric caves
