= Dobroselica =

Dobroselica may refer to the following villages in Serbia:

- Dobroselica (Rekovac)
- Dobroselica (Čajetina)
