= Zlatibor (disambiguation) =

Zlatibor may refer to:

== Places ==
- Zlatibor, mountain in Serbia
- Zlatibor District, district in Serbia
- Zlatibor (town), town in Serbia, in the Čajetina Municipality
- Zlatibor Lake, lake in town Zlatibor, Serbia

== Sports ==
- FK Zlatibor, based in Užice
- FK Zlatibor, based in Čajetina
- KK Zlatibor, based in Čajetina
