= Zlatibor =

Mountain in Serbia

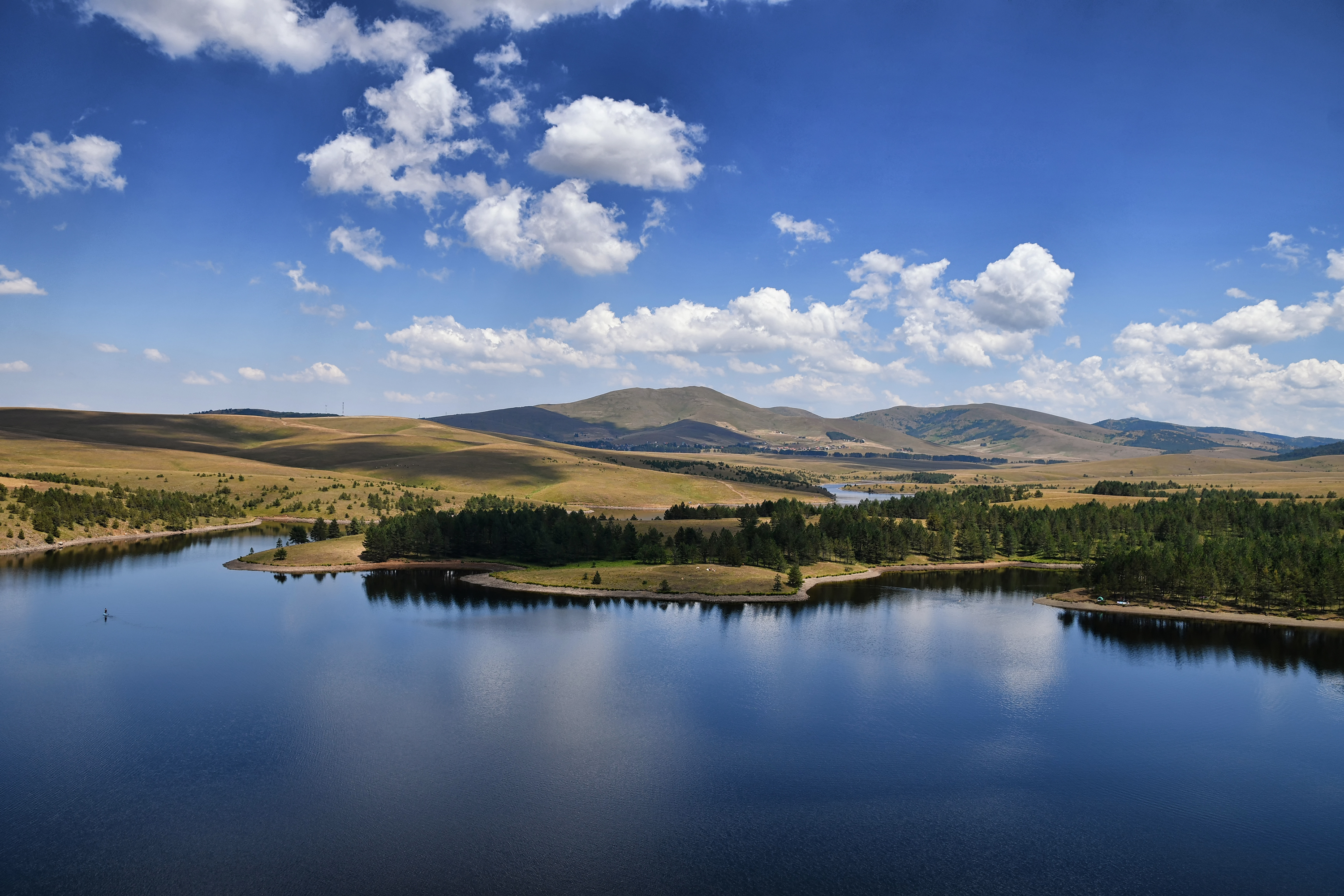

Highest point
- Elevation: 1,496 m (4,908 ft)
- Coordinates: 43°38′54″N 19°40′45″E

Geography
- Location within Serbia
- Location: Western Serbia
- Parent range: Dinaric Alps

Zlatibor (Serbian Cyrillic: Златибoр pronounced [zlǎtibɔːr]) is a mountain in western Serbia.

Among the most popular places in Serbia for tourism, Zlatibor's main attractions include health tourism, skiing, and hiking and the longest panoramic gondola lift in the world. Tornik ski resort is located in the area.

The largest city in the region is Užice—located at the foothills of the mountain—while most of the area belongs to the municipality of Čajetina. The town of Zlatibor has changed over the years from a group of vacation homes to an urban location with diverse amenities. The Zlatibor region is divided among two municipalities, Čajetina and Užice, both located in the Zlatibor District. The Belgrade-Bar railroad passes through Zlatibor.

== History ==
In the Middle Ages, the region was known as Rujno, a župa that was part of Raška, a centre of the medieval Serbian state.

The name Zlatibor came into the 18th century, but its etymology is uncertain. It probably stems from the Serbian words zlatni (golden) and bor (pine). Pinus sylvestris var. zlatiborica is a subspecies of pine originating from the mountain, and is endangered today. By 2021, there were no more remaining golden pine trees in its natural habitat. The last surviving tree cracked under the snow and was brought down by the storm on the Murtenica slope, in the Negbina village. Only grafted trees in urban areas survived, including towns of Zlatibor and Čajetina.

Medieval Uvac Monastery, dedicated to the Nativity of Mary, was destroyed by the Ottomans in the late 17th century. Today located in the village of Stublo, its remains were surveyed in the 1990s, and the monastery was rebuilt. It was consecrated on 21 September 1995, Nativity of Mary's Day. The remains of another destroyed medieval monastery, Dubrava, were found in 2001. Ruins of the church and konak were discovered, as was the vault with 260 Venetian gold coins from the 17th century. The monastery was fully rebuilt following that.

Cigla, a hill close to the nearby village of Jablanica, still has some borderline markings of the Kingdom of Serbia, Austria-Hungary, and the Ottoman Empire.

=== World War II ===
In the late 1941, the mountain became a focal point of the treasure hunt connected with the withdrawal of the Partisans from the collapsing free territory of the Republic of Užice. After taking Užice, the Partisans confiscated much paper and silver money. On 10 October 1941 they shipped two trucks to the mountain and buried the money. Another quantity of money, only silver, was taken with them during the withdrawal in the end of November and buried on Zlatibor. After the war, the official story of the Partisans was that all the money was later seized by the Germans and the Chetniks, but after the fall of Communism, different information surfaced.

On 28 November 1941, Josip Broz Tito and Slobodan Penezić Krcun ordered the silver to be transported to the Zlatibor villa of the Belgrade lawyer Aca Pavlović. There were 103 cases, 60 kg each, or 6 tons in total. It was disguised as an ammunition. The treasure was then transported to the location of Borova Glava, where at the locality of Jokina Ćuprija part of it was buried, but the work was not finished due to the German offensive, so an attempt was made to move the remaining part. As transport by trucks was not an option due to the German offensive, the Partisans carried the crates on their backs. As they were chased by the Germans, the Partisans threw away the crates and the silver scattered over the meadows in the direction of the river Rzav, the Partisans managing to keep only few bags of paper money.

According to the report of the Chief of Staff, the Partisans lost half of the paper money during the withdrawal across the Zlatibor, while the silver coins were sloppily buried and then stolen by "some people". Both the Germans and the local population in the ensuing period searched and collected treasure on the mountain. Germans discovered the main vault left by the Partisans (1.8 million dinars at the time) in the search party organized on 3 December. They also collected most of the silver which was dispersed on the mountain.

During the winter and summer of 1944, 47 Allied airmen were shot down over the mountain by the German anti-aircraft units. They were saved and hidden by the local Chetniks. The airmen were later secretly transported to the airstrip in Pranjani, some 75 km (47 mi) to the northeast, from where they were airlifted by the Allied forces in Operation Halyard.

== Geography ==
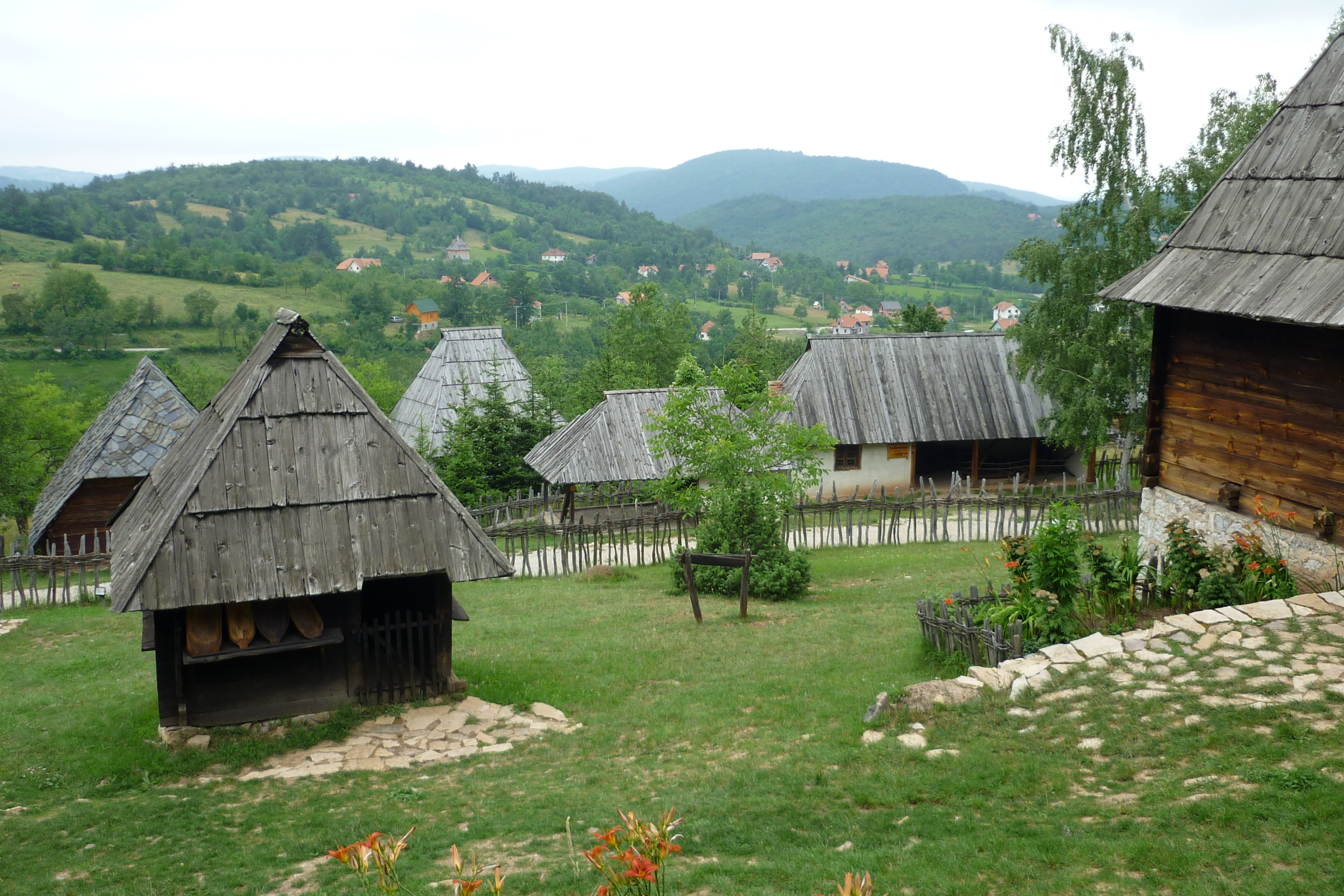
Traditional architecture in Sirogojno

Zlatibor itself is located in the northern part of the Stari Vlah region, a historical border region between Raška, Herzegovina and Bosnia. It spreads over an area of 300 km^{2} (120 sq mi), 43 km (27 mi) in length, southeast to northwest, and up to 37 km (23 mi) in width. Its highest peak, Tornik, has an elevation of 1,496 m. Zlatibor is situated between 43° 31' N, and 43° 51' N, and between 19° 28' E and 19° 56' E.

The southern and the eastern border of Zlatibor are natural – the rivers Uvac and Veliki Rzav. Villages of Mokra Gora, Semegnjevo and Jablanica mark its western border towards the Tara Mountain. Southern part of Zlatibor, extending towards the Zlatar mountains, is referred to as Murtenica. There is a 22 m (72 ft) tall Gostilje waterfall on the mountain, in the village of the same name.

There are several caves on the mountain, like Stopića Cave and Prerast Cave, on the southern slopes. Prerast is a typical natural "stone bridge", formed with the collapse of the cave ceiling above the stream. It is also known as the Točkovička Cave or Šupljica. The cave is 48 m (157 ft) long, 12 m (39 ft) high, while the entry points are 12 m (39 ft) (upper entry) and 16 m (52 ft) (lower exit) high. The stone arch above is 20 m (66 ft) thick.

Artificial lake Ribnica was created in 1971. The Crni Rzav river was dammed to create a reservoir for household usage.

=== Climate ===
The climate is humid continental (Köppen climate classification: Dfb).

Climate data for Zlatibor (1991–2020, extremes 1961–2020)
Month	Jan	Feb	Mar	Apr	May	Jun	Jul	Aug	Sep	Oct	Nov	Dec	Year
Record high °C (°F)	17.6 (63.7)	20.3 (68.5)	24.9 (76.8)	26.4 (79.5)	30.1 (86.2)	32.2 (90.0)	35.8 (96.4)	34.4 (93.9)	33.2 (91.8)	28.6 (83.5)	25.5 (77.9)	17.2 (63.0)	35.8 (96.4)
Mean daily maximum °C (°F)	2.4 (36.3)	3.9 (39.0)	7.9 (46.2)	12.9 (55.2)	17.6 (63.7)	21.5 (70.7)	23.6 (74.5)	24.1 (75.4)	18.7 (65.7)	14.2 (57.6)	8.8 (47.8)	2.9 (37.2)	13.2 (55.8)
Daily mean °C (°F)	−1.7 (28.9)	−0.6 (30.9)	2.9 (37.2)	7.8 (46.0)	12.4 (54.3)	16.2 (61.2)	18.1 (64.6)	18.3 (64.9)	13.4 (56.1)	9.1 (48.4)	4.3 (39.7)	−0.9 (30.4)	8.3 (46.9)
Mean daily minimum °C (°F)	−4.8 (23.4)	−4.1 (24.6)	−0.9 (30.4)	3.5 (38.3)	7.8 (46.0)	11.4 (52.5)	13.1 (55.6)	13.5 (56.3)	9.3 (48.7)	5.3 (41.5)	1.1 (34.0)	−3.9 (25.0)	4.3 (39.7)
Record low °C (°F)	−22.8 (−9.0)	−19.9 (−3.8)	−18.7 (−1.7)	−8.8 (16.2)	−3.3 (26.1)	−2.2 (28.0)	4.1 (39.4)	2.4 (36.3)	−2.0 (28.4)	−11.2 (11.8)	−14.5 (5.9)	−19.0 (−2.2)	−22.8 (−9.0)
Average precipitation mm (inches)	63.4 (2.50)	71.2 (2.80)	81.0 (3.19)	82.1 (3.23)	105.1 (4.14)	115.1 (4.53)	101.3 (3.99)	74.5 (2.93)	96.4 (3.80)	81.4 (3.20)	80.4 (3.17)	79.9 (3.15)	1,031.8 (40.62)
Average precipitation days (≥ 0.1 mm)	15.1	15.5	15.3	16.0	16.5	14.7	11.8	10.7	12.2	11.8	12.5	15.8	167.9
Average snowy days	13.4	12.9	11.1	4.4	0.5	0.1	0.0	0.0	0.1	1.7	6.1	12.1	62.4
Average relative humidity (%)	83.3	79.7	74.0	69.4	70.8	72.1	69.7	68.6	74.4	77.6	79.7	85.0	75.4
Mean monthly sunshine hours	89.7	103.3	148.0	168.8	209.9	241.5	276.8	270.2	192.5	159.6	106.7	76.6	2,043.6
Source: Republic Hydrometeorological Service of Serbia

== Tourism ==
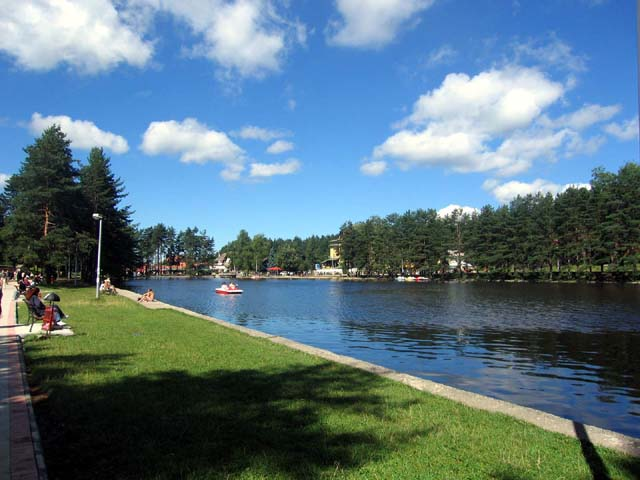
Lake in the center of Kraljeva Voda

Situated at an elevation of just over 1,000 metres, Zlatibor is a climatic resort, characterized by a cool alpine climate, clean air, long periods of sunshine during the summer and a heavy snow cover in winter. Tourist facilities include modern hotels, holiday centers and cottages, sports grounds and skiing tracks.

A tourist era on Zlatibor officially began on 20 August 1893, when the King of Serbia Aleksandar Obrenović decided to establish a health resort after an initiative from local hoteliers. In his honor, a fountain was erected on the place where he had lunch and named Kraljeva Voda ("King's water"). The fountain was later accompanied by the small artificial Zlatibor Lake, formed in 1947. It was built by damming the Obudovica river during one of the Youth work actions, in a project by engineer Miladin Pećinar. Pećinar planned to turn the bogs which surrounded the Obudovica into lake during Interbellum, and finished the project on 2 January 1941. Due to the outbreak of the war, construction was on hold until 1946. The monument to Pećinar was dedicated in the forest next to the lake.

The facility which "opened the gates of Zlatibor" for tourism was the Užice-Kraljeva Voda road. The 27 km (17 mi) long road was built from 1923 to 1927 and is today known as the Zlatibor road. It is part of the European route E763.

In 1945 the settlement was renamed Partizanske Vode after Yugoslav Partisans, but in 1991 the town received the current name Zlatibor. The area is a location of numerous hotels, villas, restaurants, open swimming pools and other sports facilities. Eventually, residents of surrounding villages of Sirogojno, Gostilje, Jablanica, Rožanstvo, Ljubiš, Tripkova and the town of Čajetina opened their homes to tourists and built other facilities. There are 20 marked hiking paths on the mountain. They have a total length of 300 km (190 mi) and all were fully arranged and equipped by 2023. Most of them are longer than 10 km (6.2 mi) but are generally easy to hike and accessible to regular hikers. The longest is the Zlatibor-Spomenik-Čuker trail, with 21.9 km (13.6 mi), while the shortest, and marked as the hardest, is the 9 km (5.6 mi) long Stublo-Omarski Potok.

The lake was completely emptied in April and May 2020 for renovation, which includes the nearby Kraljev Trg ("King's Square"). The lakebed was washed and cleaned, a diversion channel will be built around it to conduct dirty water during the rainfall, and a multi-purpose floating stage will be placed on the lake. The floating multi-media fountain, with light, video, laser, and audio effects, and with the 18 m (59 ft) tall water jet, became operational on the lake on 29 June 2022.

The mountain is known for the textile production, especially of woolen clothing. It was also one of the rare regions where clothing was made from goat hair, before the federal government banned goat herding in 1948. Since the 1960s, under the direction of designer Dobrila Smiljanić, the production was modernized and almost turned into an industry, centered in Sirogojno. Sirogojno brand of woolen clothes became a world known trademark. In 1992, a clothing museum "Staro selo" ("Old village") was opened in Sirogojno.

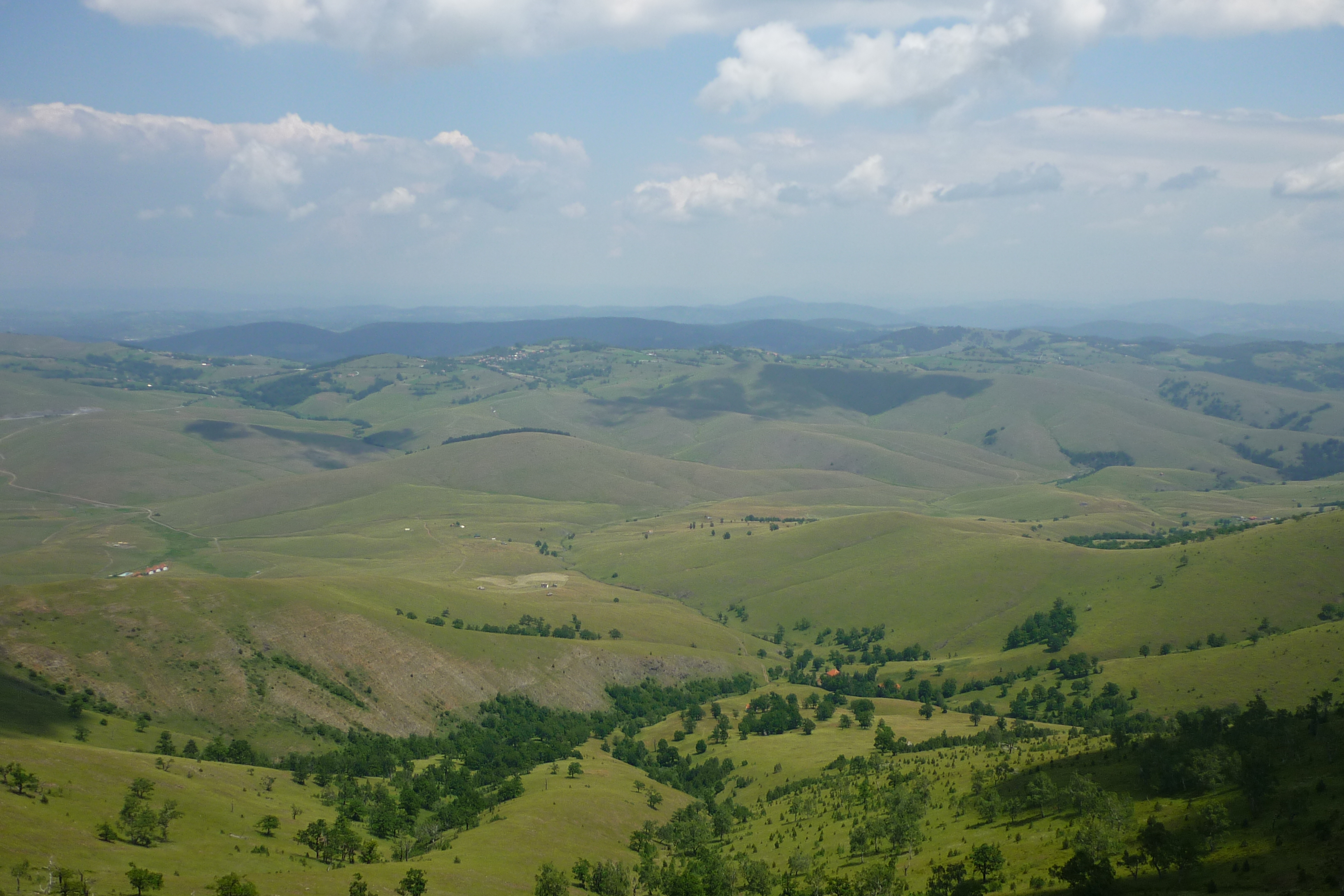
Landscape of the region

Since 2005, an annual "Village Multisport Event" (Seoski višeboj) has been held in the village of Jablanica. The event consists of performing various old tasks (lighting of the evergreen-produced tar kilns, dancing and singing folk songs, logs sawing, horse races, stone throwing, climbing the poles and, the main event, ox-powered dragging of tree trunks down the mountain). At the Vodice locality, 14 km (8.7 mi) from Zlatibor town, a Western-style resort and theme park "El Paso City" was opened in May 2020. It covers 6 ha (15 acres), including a hotel but also bungalows in the shape of tents, caravans and wagons, horse stable and Indian village named after Sitting Bull. The river which flows through the complex divides it into the Western section and a Serbian one across from it, which includes a church and hamlet.

In the mid-19th century, the business of trade caravans blossomed in the Užice and Zlatibor area. The merchant heading the caravan was called kiridžija (plural kiridžije). The caravans had 15 to 20 horses and Zlatibor merchants became famous for their work. Photographer Ilija Lazić took a photo of kiridžija Todor Udovičić Gajević (by some sources Todor Gajović) in the early 20th century, which became iconic. Lazić named it "Zlatibor's fast train" and used it for postcards. A real railroad reached Užice in 1912, and the number of caravan merchants began to dwindle. With the introduction of motor vehicles, kiridžije disappeared by 1950. Based on the photo, Miladin Lekić, self-taught sculptor, carved wooden sculptures of Gajević (generically referred to as Era, named for the inhabitant of southwest Serbia) and his horse, 2.6 m (8 ft 6 in) and 2.5 m (8 ft 2 in) tall, respectively. They were made of wood from Stubla: Gajević from oak, and the horse from elm wood. The sculptures were placed in the center of King's Square in 2013, marking 120 years of organized tourism in Zlatibor. During the 2020 reconstruction, the sculptures were moved to the starting section of the promenade. The sculptural group is called "Zlatibor's fast train", after the photo.

Thanks to the geographic configuration and favorable microclimate, which includes temperate wind intensity, Zlatibor is one of the most suitable paragliding locations in Serbia. Especially popular are the Čigota-Čukar ridge and the southern slope of Tornik. In 2021 there were two paragliding clubs and at least six designated launching spots. After 3 days of trial operation, on 14 January 2021, the longest panoramic gondola lift in the world became operational. It connects the center of Zlatibor with the Tornik peak, via the Ribnica Lake. It is 8.95 km (5.56 mi) long, has 55 gondolas with 10 seats each and is designed to transport 600 passengers in one hour.

== Protection ==
The process began in January 2016, and in October 2017 the government placed part of the mountain under protection as the Nature Park of Zlatibor. The land within the "protected area of exceptional importance" (IUCN Category I) is 56% privately owned and covers the villages of Semegnjevo, Jablanica, Stublo, Dobroselica, Ljubiš and Gostilje. The settled area is in the lowest, third level of protection while the first level of protection occupies 4.69% of the entire area, or 1,968.89 ha (4,865.2 acres). Within the park there are four regions: Viogor, Black Rzav, Uvac Gorge and Griža Gorge. There are also previously protected areas: a strict natural reserve "Park Forest" (12.54 ha (31.0 acres)) and natural monuments "Lira black pine" (near Nova Varoš) and "Three black pines – Dobroselica" (near Čajetina). The total area of the park is 41.923 ha (103.59 acres).

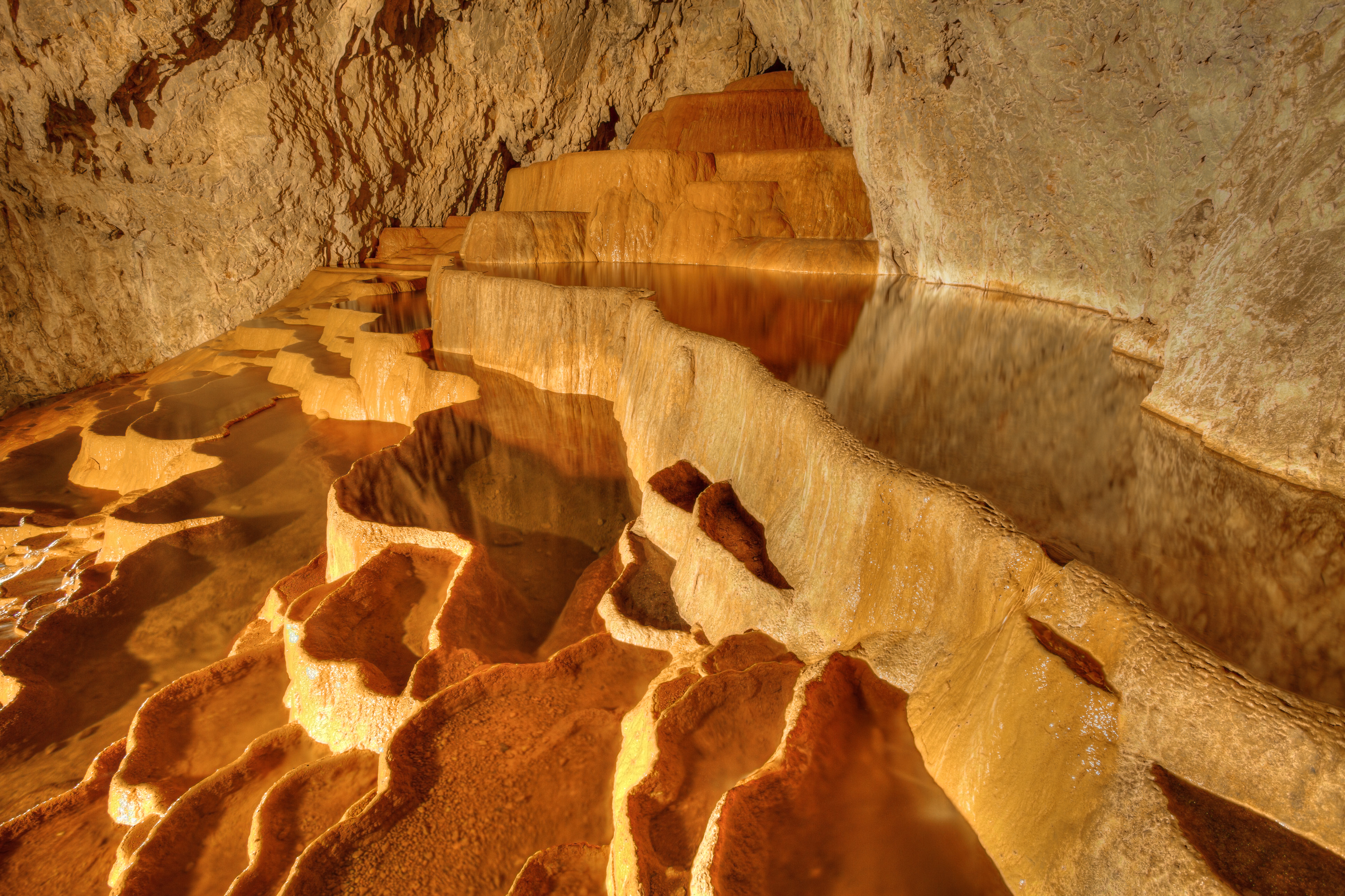
Stopića Cave

There are 1,044 species of plants in the park. The prevailing fauna consists of the autochthonous black pine forests and the mixed forests of black and Scots pine, which are categorized as a priority habitats by the Natura 2000. Medicinal herbs mountain germander, Breckland thyme, common yarrow and great yellow gentian grow on the mountain, while forest fruits include wild blackberry, blueberry, woodland strawberry and chequers. Various fungi live in the park, too, like cep, parasol mushroom, saffron milk cap and field mushroom.

There are 18 species of amphibians and reptiles, 154 species of birds (42% of all bird species recorded in Serbia) and 38 species of mammals (40%). With the gradual return of wolves and bears in the 21st century, the tracking of the animals which began in 2017 on the Golija mountain, showed that the Zlatibor area is a main transit area for brown bears, which passed through here to the south and southeast areas, including Tara, Šargan, Mokra Gora, Golija, Uvac and Zlatar. 2019 surveys showed that a permanent population of brown bear settled at Zlatibor itself. Other mammals include otter, badger, wildcat and marten.

By 2023, number of bears grew and they began to attack stables, orchards and beehives, which are abundant in the region. As authorities were slow to respond, the residents began to shoot or poison the bears. A program was proposed in March 2023 which includes bear-proof fences, introduction of more shepherd dogs and strategic planting of specific trees. Plan is also to turn the bears into one of the touristic attractions of the mountain, akin to the nearby man-made feeding ground for vultures which attracts 35,000 people yearly.

The park includes three cultural monuments and numerous items of an architectural legacy.

The park is bounded by the Uvac river on the south, border with Bosnia and Herzegovina on the west, mountains of Mokra Gora, Semegnjevo and Grude on the north and the mountain of Murtenica and Katušnica river on the east. Ribnica Lake and Čigota massif are within the park, while the towns of Čajetina and Zlatibor remain outside.

In June 2021, the wastewater treatment facility "Zlatibor" was opened after six months of trial running. The facility was built from 2017 onwards and is considered the most modern one in Serbia. It is constructed along the Obudovica river valley. The Obudovica drains the wastewater from Zlatibor into the Crni Rzav, and then further into the Drina.

The town of Zlatibor itself, however, experienced massive, unplanned urban expansion since the 2010s. Due to the crammed buildings and lack of planned development, it has earned a moniker "Kaluđerica on the Mountain", as Belgrade's suburb Kaluđerica has been for the long time described as the largest unplanned settlement in the Balkans or even Europe.

== See also ==
- List of mountains in Serbia
