= Ponikve Airport =

Airport in Serbia

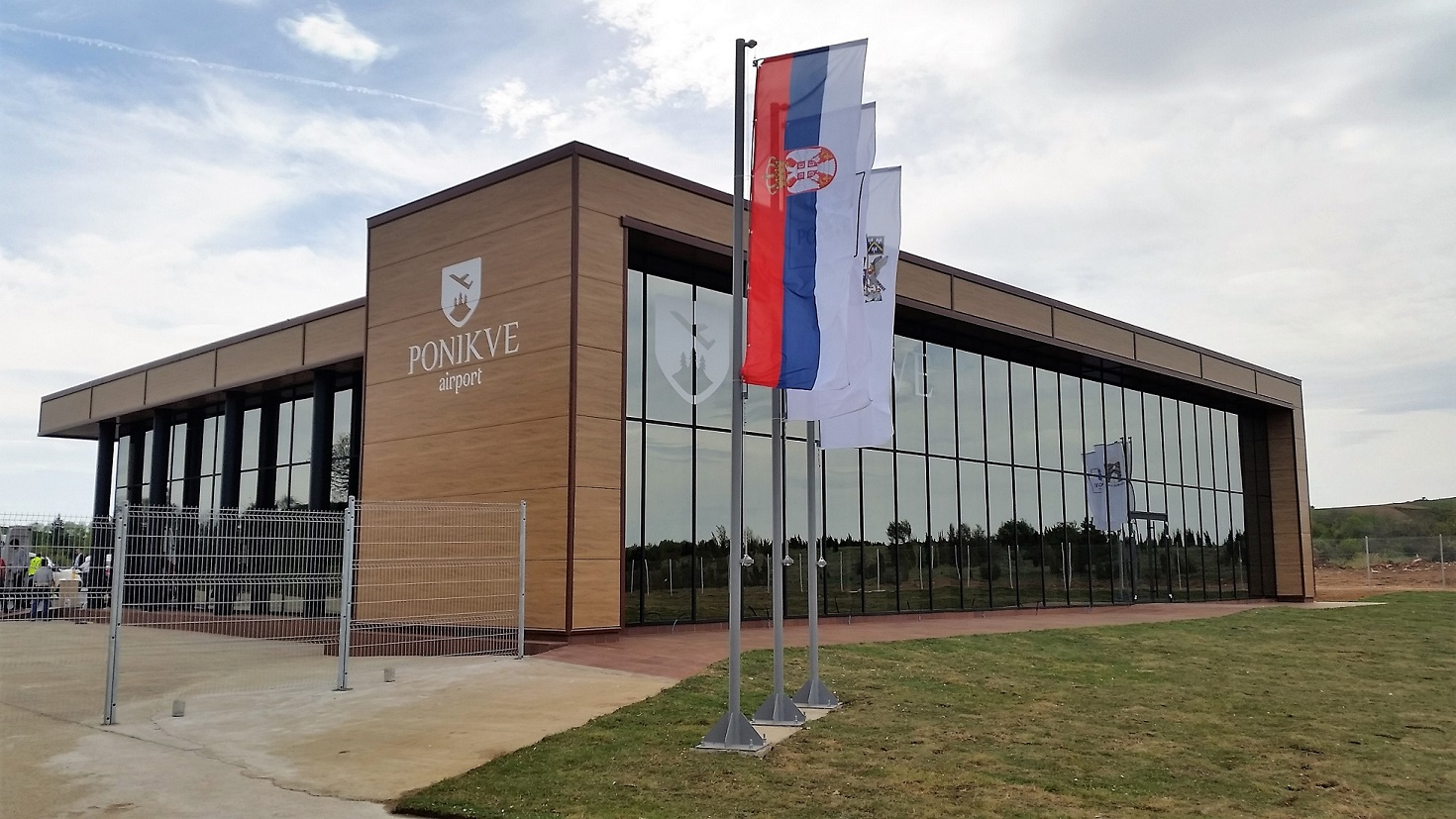
- IATA: UZC; ICAO: LYUZ

Summary
- Airport type: Public
- Owner: Government of Serbia
- Operator: Airports of Serbia
- Serves: Užice, Čajetina, Zlatibor
- Location: Užice, Serbia
- Elevation AMSL: 2,943–2,999 ft (897–914 m)
- Coordinates: 43°53′55.99″N 19°41′51.66″E
- Website: aerodromponikve.rs

Map
- Location of the airport in Serbia

Runways
Direction	Length		Surface
Direction	ft	m	Surface
11L/29R	10,499	3,200	Concrete/Asphalt
11R/29L	4,921	1,500	Grass

Statistics (2019)
- Passenger number: 34 ▲

Airports of Serbia
- Native name: Аеродроми Србије
- Romanized name: Aerodromi Srbije
- Type: Limited liability company
- Industry: Aviation
- Founded: 2 February 2016; 10 years ago
- Founder: Government of Serbia
- Headquarters: Vazduhoplovaca 24, Niš, Serbia
- Key people: Mihajlo Zdravković (Director)
- Services: Airport management
- Revenue: €4.21 million (2020) ▲
- Net income: €1.16 million (2020) ▲
- Total assets: €96.30 million (2020) ▲
- Total equity: €91.62 million (2020) ▲
- Owner: Government of Serbia (100%)
- Number of employees: 200 (2020)
- Subsidiaries: Aerodrom Trebinje d.o.o. (Bosnia and Herzegovina)
- Website: www.aerodromisrbije.rs
- Footnotes; Business ID: 07343914; Tax ID: 101531405

Ponikve Airport (Serbian: Аеродром Поникве / Aerodrom Ponikve) (IATA: UZC, ICAO: LYUZ) is an airport in the western part of Serbia, located on the Ponikve plateau: 12 km (7.5 mi) northwest from the city of Užice. The airport boasts one of the longest runways in the Balkans, and the second longest in Serbia.

In the vicinity of the airport are some of the popular tourist attractions and ski resorts such as: Zlatibor, Tara and Mokra Gora.

== History ==
Ponikve Airport was built in the period from 1979 to 1983, but until 1992, it wasn't used. In 1996 and 1997, Jat Airways, then known as JAT Yugoslav Airlines, served the airport twice a week for a domestic round line Užice–Belgrade–Tivat–Užice, with an ATR 72 turboprop aircraft. Operations ceased in 1998 as the number of passengers reduced greatly.

Ponikve airport had been heavily bombarded by NATO forces during the 1999 NATO bombing of Yugoslavia. This led to complete destruction of the runway and facilities for any civilian or military use.

On 21 October 2013, the Ponikve Airport greeted its first international civil flight, with a Cessna Citation CJ3 that contained two crew members and five-member delegation of businessmen from Brussels landing at the airport. In the afternoon of the same day, a business jet departed from the airport to Thessaloniki.

Since 2006, the process of reconstruction of the Ponikve Airport has begun. The runway reconstruction has been completed and as of 2016, it has 3,200 metres (10,499 ft) in length (around 2,300 metres (7,546 ft) reconstructed). Also, the new terminal building was built in 2016.

The airport, which boasts a new terminal building, was taken over by the state in 2018. In 2019, a 3,735 metres (12,254 ft) perimeter fence was erected, however, a further 5,195 metres (17,044 ft) were required. In addition, the final 800 metres (2,600 ft) of the 3,200 metres (10,500 ft) long runway must be resurfaced, and a lighting system installed. Some five million euros are necessary in order for the airport to be put into commercial use.

Airports of Serbia submitted a request to the Ministry of Transportation to decide on the need to prepare a study on environmental impact assessment of the project of phased reconstruction of Ponikve airport. As stated in the preliminary design, the reconstruction will be done in 5 phases, for critical aircraft Airbus A320neo and Boeing 757. The first and second phases include the rehabilitation of the runway, drainage system, cable ducts of the light marking system and horizontal and vertical signaling of part of the runway, for the critical Airbus A320 neo aircraft. The third phase includes the expansion of the turntable on the threshold of the 28 runway in order to create opportunities for turning the critical Boeing 757 aircraft. The subject of the project of phase 4 is the construction of a new taxiway 23 m wide and the construction of a platform, and in the fifth phase the reconstruction of the protective belt at the end of the runway will be done for the critical Boeing 757 aircraft.

== Airlines and destinations ==
As of 10 January 2023, there are no regular commercial passenger flights to/from Ponikve Airport.

== Statistics ==
The passenger numbers are from general aviation operations, both domestically and international.

Year	Passengers	Change	Aircraft movements	Change	Cargo (t)	Change
2016	92	Steady	Steady	Steady	N/A	Steady
2017	37	▼59.8%	148	▲	N/A	Steady
2018	20	▼45.1%	349	▲135.9%	N/A	Steady
2019	34	▲70.0%	394	▲12.9%	N/A	Steady
2022	49	▲	196	▲	N/A	Steady

== See also ==
- List of airports in Serbia
- Airports of Serbia
- Transport in Serbia
- Air Serbia
