= Ribnica Lake =

Lake in Serbia

Lake Ribnica
- Рибничко језеро (Serbian); Ribničko jezero (Serbian)
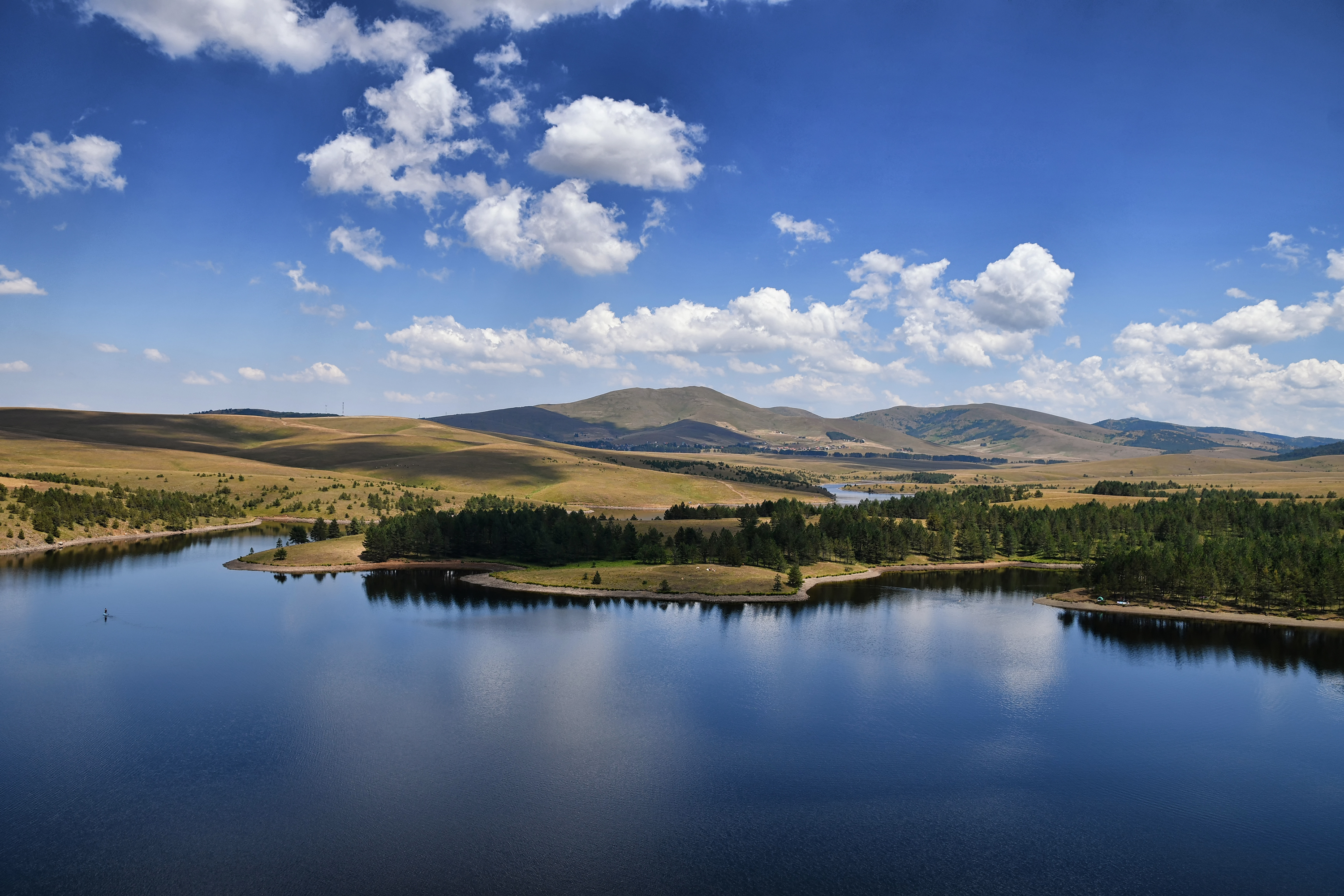
- Lake Ribnica

- Location within Serbia
- Location: Zlatibor, Central Serbia, Serbia
- Coordinates: 43°40′56″N 19°40′37″E
- Type: Reservoir
- Primary outflows: Crni Rzav
- Surface area: 10 square kilometres (3.9 sq mi)

Lake Ribnica (Serbian: Рибничко језеро, romanized: Ribničko jezero) is a lake in Serbia.

== Geography ==
Lake Ribnica is located in the Zlatibor mountains, in the west of Central Serbia and in the municipality of Cajetina. It is found 8 kilometres (5.0 mi) from the town of Kraljeve Vode, also known as Zlatibor, the tourist centre of the mountain. It is located on the route which runs to Mount Tornik and the monastery of Uvac. Its geographic coordinates are 43°40′56″N 19°40′37″E. It covers around 10 kilometres (6.21 mi).

== Characteristics ==
Lake Ribnica is an artificial lake, built in 1971 due to the construction of a dam on the Crni Rzav, the "Black Rzav", one of the arms of the Rzav in Zlatibor; the dam provides food and drinking water for the towns of Kralje Vode (Zlatibor) and Čajetina. The lake is abundant in fish, particularly gudgeon, trout, tench and silurus.

== See also ==
- List of lakes in Serbia
