= Mokra Gora =

Mokra Gora Мокра Гора
- Village
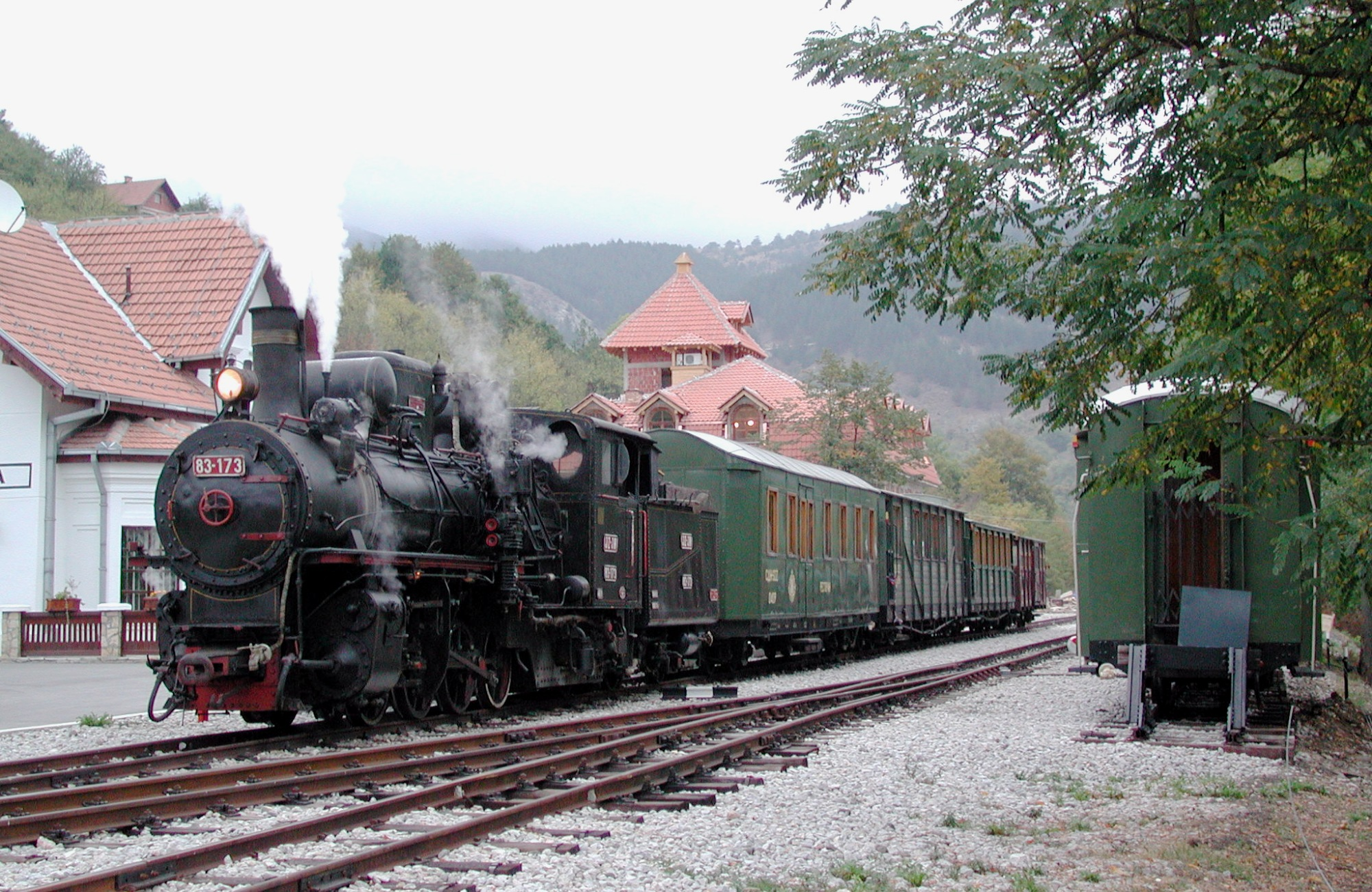
- Mokra Gora railway station in September 2003.

- Location within Serbia
- Coordinates (railway station): 43.792478°N 19.506933°E
- Country: Serbia
- Statistical region: Šumadija and Western Serbia
- District: Zlatibor District
- Municipality: Užice

Area
  - Total: 47.74 km^{2} (18.43 sq mi)
- Elevation: 729 m (2,392 ft)

Population (2011)
  - Total: 549
  - Density: 11.5/km^{2} (29.8/sq mi)
- Time zone: +1
- Postal code: 31243
- Area code: 031

Mokra Gora (Serbian Cyrillic: Мокра Гора, lit. 'Wet Mountain', pronounced [mɔ̝̂kraː ɡɔ̝̌ra]) is a village located in the city of Užice, southwestern Serbia. It is situated on the northern slopes of the Zlatibor Mountains. Emphasis on historical reconstruction has made it into a popular tourist center with unique attractions.

Mokra Gora has become popular after 2003 reconstruction of a narrow gauge railway called Šargan Eight which is unique in the world. Its route viewed from the sky, looks like the number eight.

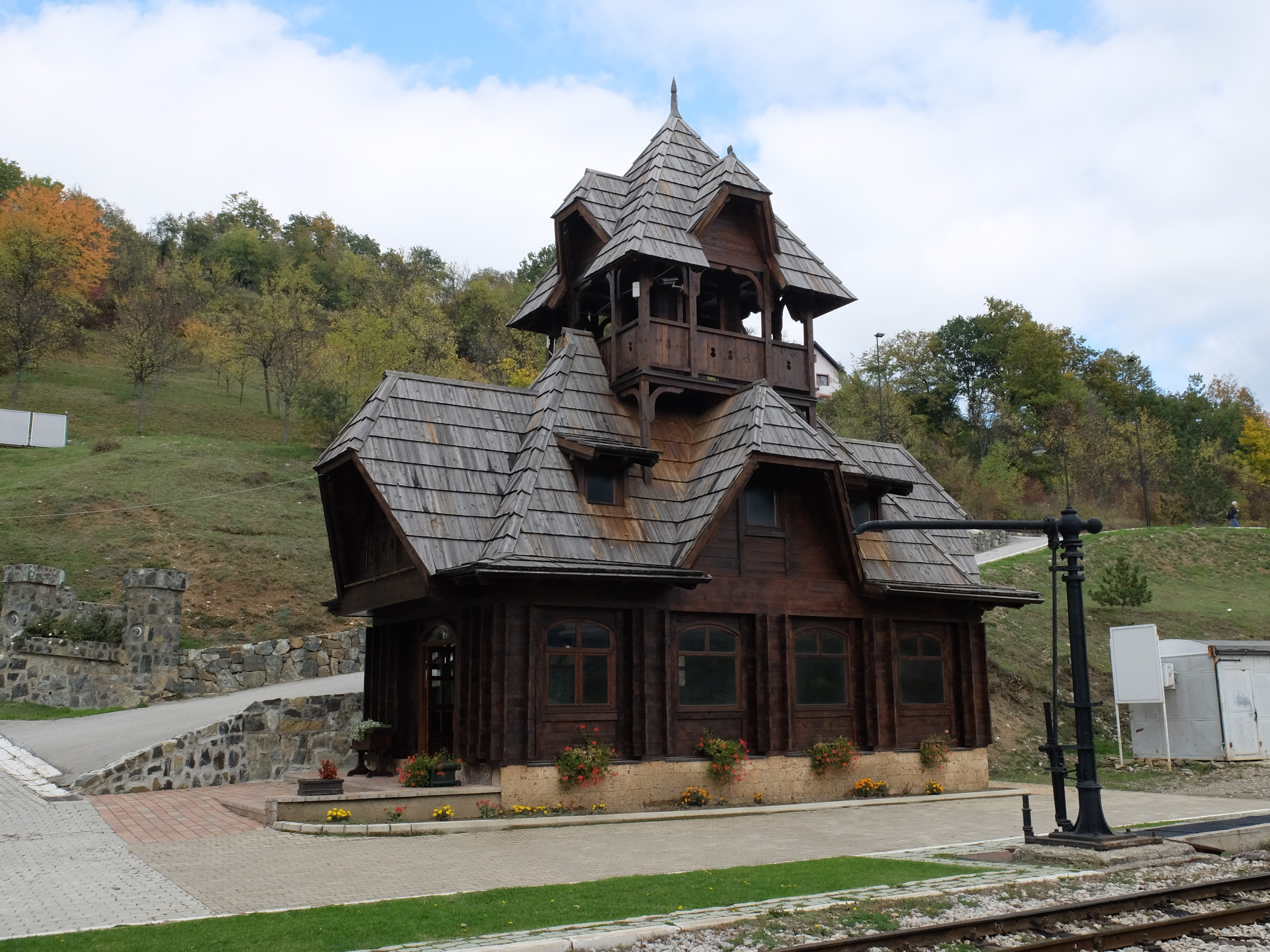
Mokra Gora Railway Museum

== Drvengrad ==
In addition, the well-known Serbian film director Emir Kusturica has also made a contribution to the development of tourism in Mokra Gora. In 2004, he financed the construction of an ethno village Drvengrad ('Timber Town') near Mokra Gora. For this development, Kusturica received the "Philippe Rotthier European Architecture Award" from the "Brussels Foundation for Architecture".

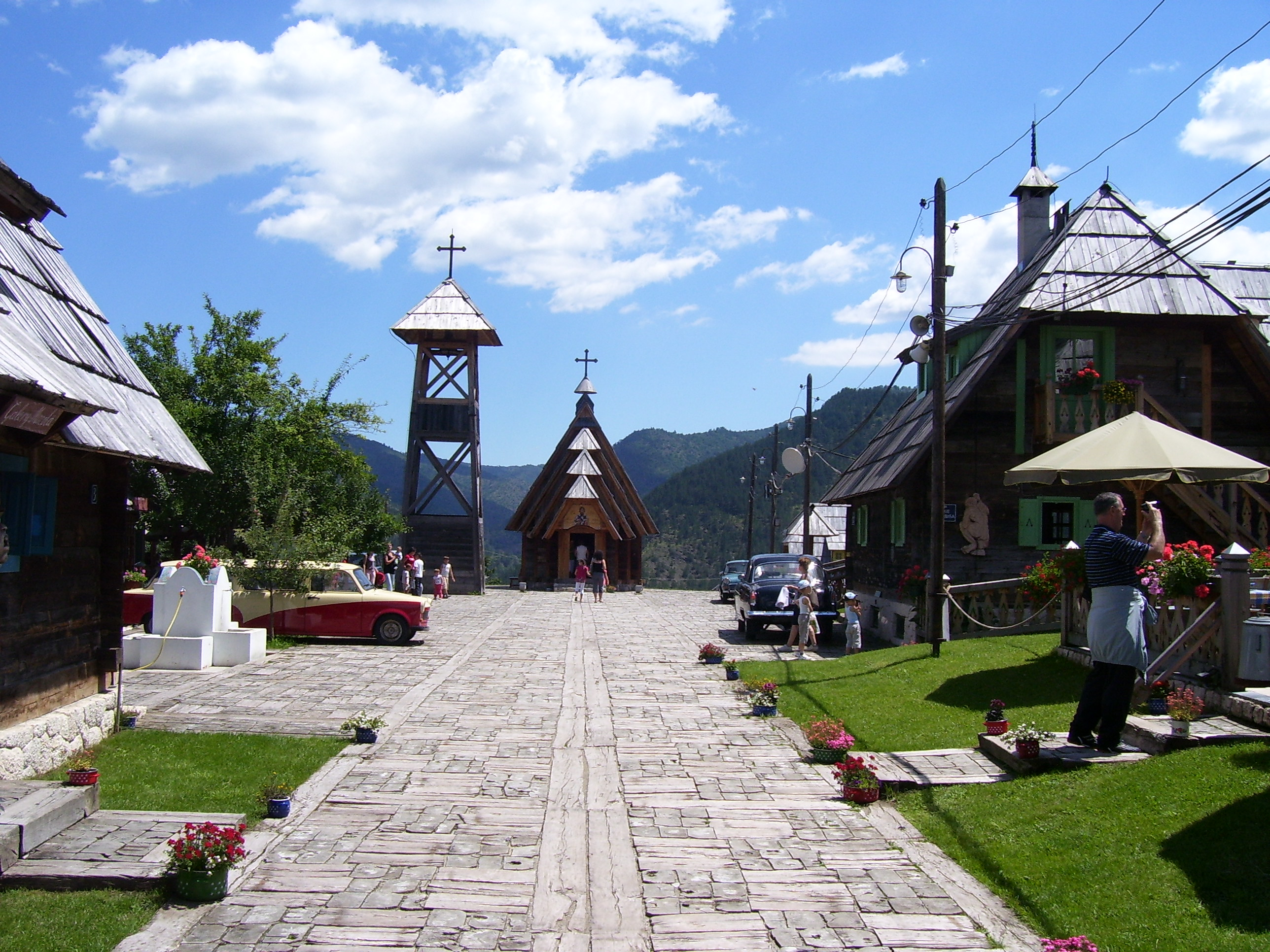
Ethno village - Drvengrad

== See also ==
- Užice-Ponikve Airport (nearby airport)
- Tornik ski resort (nearby ski resort)
