= Milan Smiljanić (priest) =

Serbian protopriest and soldier (1891–1979)

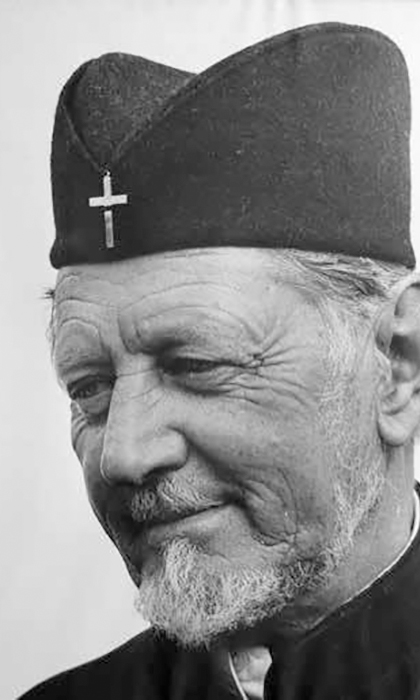
- Died: 14 July 1979
- Occupation: Eastern Orthodox priest

Milan Smiljanic (c. 1891 - August 1979) was a protopriest of the Serbian Orthodox Church, a participant in the Balkan Wars and the People's Liberation War, and a socio-political worker of the People's Republic of Serbia. His voice was recorded on the Voyager Golden Record saying: "Желимо вам све најлепше са наше планете" (Želimo vam sve najlepše sa naše planete; We wish you all the best, from our planet).

== Biography ==
Milan was born in 1891 in the village of Ravni in Zlatibor. He was the second child of father Dragomir the priest and mother Katye. He grew up in the house of his grandfather Mihajlo, also an Orthodox protopriest, who was elected MP. He attended primary school in his hometown and continued the family tradition of joining the priesthood, finishing at seminary in Belgrade. Before he was able to go to Russia for priest training, but the First Balkan War broke out. In 1912, the theologian Milan joined the Fourth Infantry Regiment "Stefan Nemanja", and went with it as a soldier to the war, in the fight for Kumanovo.

He was the first Minister of Agriculture in the Socialist Republic of Serbia (1944–1946). Until he was replaced in December 1946, he carried out agrarian reform in Serbia. Smiljanic was also elected vice president of the Presidium of the National Assembly of the People's Republic of Serbia.

As a priest, he was elected president of the Main Board, the Association of Orthodox Priests of Yugoslavia from the end of 1947.

He died in August 1979 in Sirogojno, where he was buried on August 27 in the family tomb in the gate of the Church of the Holy Apostles Peter and Paul. At his funeral, the funeral speech was given by Ivan Stambolić, Prime Minister of Serbia, while the funeral service was given by the Bishop of Žiča, Stefan Boca.

== Citations ==
- Matić, Boško (1985). Prota - The Cross and the Five-Pointed Star of Milan Smiljanić. Belgrade: Туристичка штампа.

== Archives ==
- Audio and Photo Archive
