= Murtenica =

Mountain in Serbia

- Location within Serbia

Highest point
- Elevation: 1,480 m (4,860 ft)
- Coordinates: 43°35′23″N 19°47′32″E

Geography
- Location: Western Serbia
- Parent range: Dinaric Alps

Murtenica (Serbian Cyrillic: Муртеница) is a mountain in western Serbia, forming the southern part of Zlatibor highland. It lies near the towns of Čajetina and Nova Varoš. Its highest peak, Brijač, has an elevation of 1,480 meters.

== See also ==
- List of mountains in Serbia
