= Sirogojno =

- Village
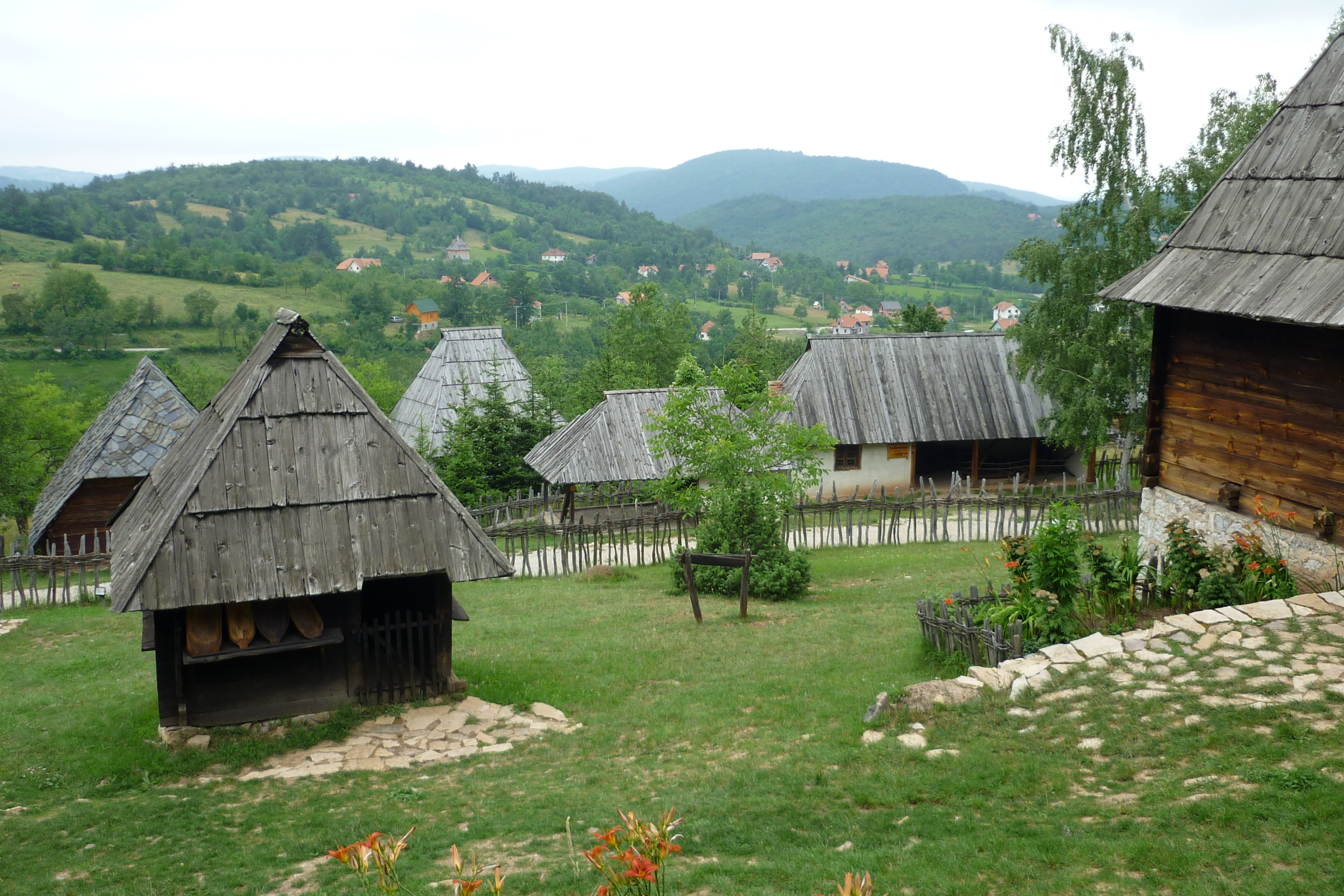
- View of a small part of the village of Sirogojno
- Interactive map of Sirogojno
- Coordinates: 43°41′10″N 19°52′47″E
- Country: Serbia

Area
  - Total: 19.14 km^{2} (7.39 sq mi)
- Elevation: 911 m (2,989 ft)

Population (2011)
  - Total: 630
  - Density: 33/km^{2} (85/sq mi)
- Time zone: UTC+1 (CET)
  - Summer (DST): UTC+2 (CEST)

Sirogojno is a village in Serbia located on Mt. Zlatibor. The village of Sirogojno was declared a Monument of Culture of Exceptional Importance in 1983, and it is protected by the Republic of Serbia.

== Museums ==
It is known for his open-air museum, or "ethno village" known as the Old Village Museum (Serbian: Музеј Старо село, romanized: Muzej Staro selo), covering nearly 5 hectares with authentic elements of ordinary life collected from all over the Zlatibor region from the 19th century. The ethno village displays a set of traditional wooden buildings, including a bakery, a dairy, and an inn, all in authentic form.

Sirogojno is also housing a Knitting museum in honor of women knitters from the Zlatibor region, who created unique clothing items with their work.

== Church of Saints Peter and Paul the Apostles ==
The Serbian Orthodox church in Sirogojno was built in 1721 by Serdar Jovan Milićić. It is dedicated to the apostles St. Peter and St. Paul, as is written on the royal doors beside the signature of icon painter Simeon Lazović. The reconstruction of the original layout of the church in Sirogojno was based on special preserved manuscripts, protocols, records, and other historical sources. The village graveyard is located next to the church and has gravestones from the 19th century with unique artistic pictures and texts.

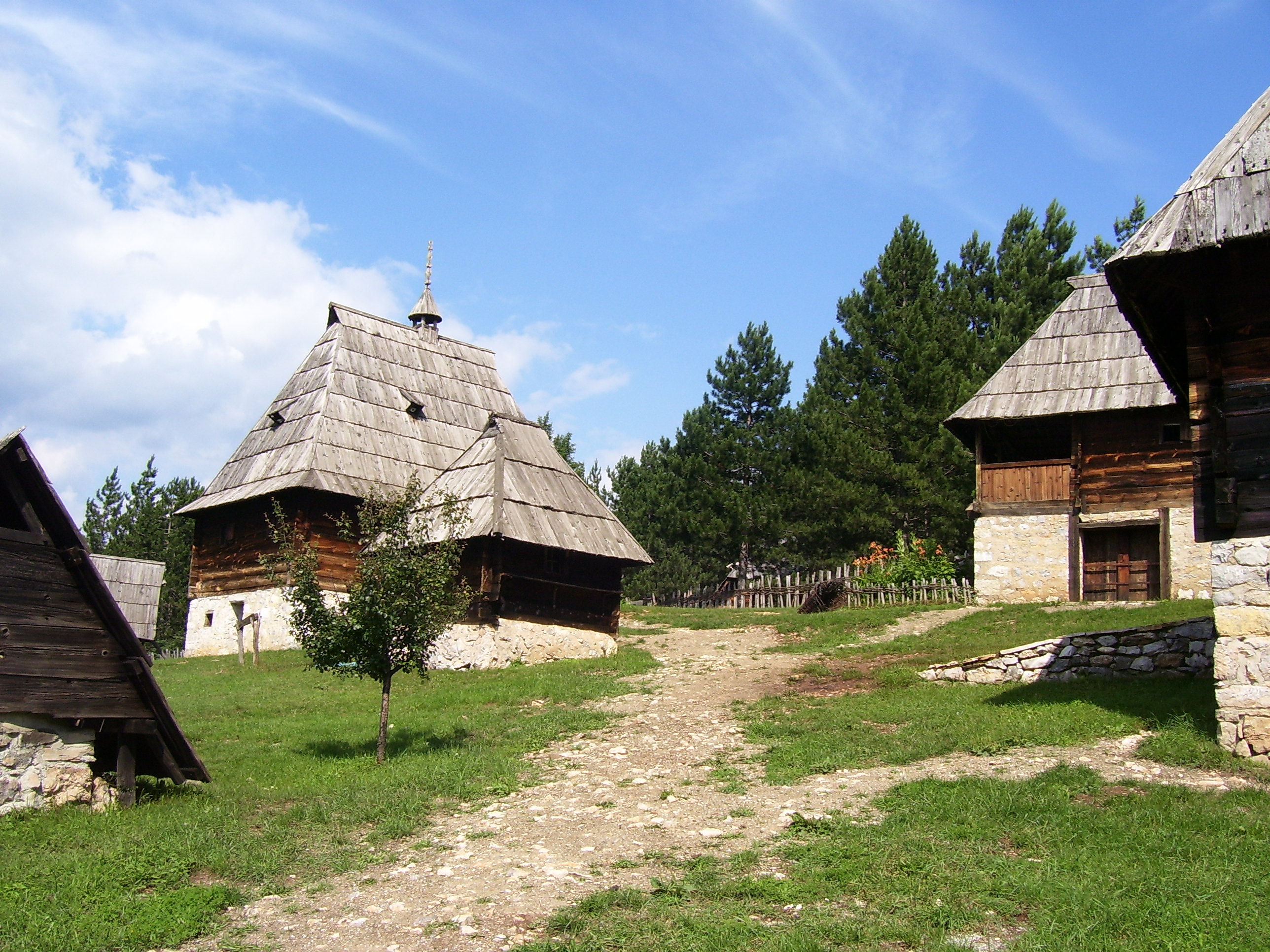
View of a small part of the village of Sirogojno

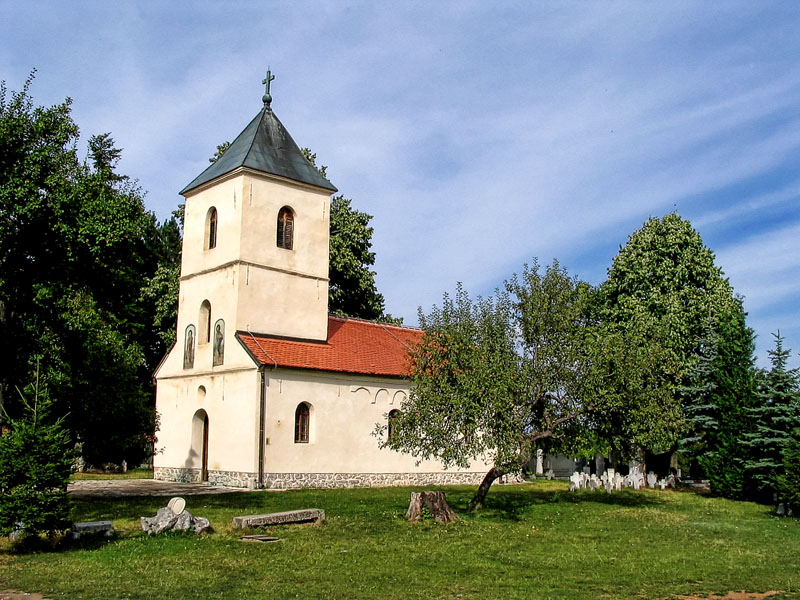
Sirogojno Serbian Orthodox church, exterior

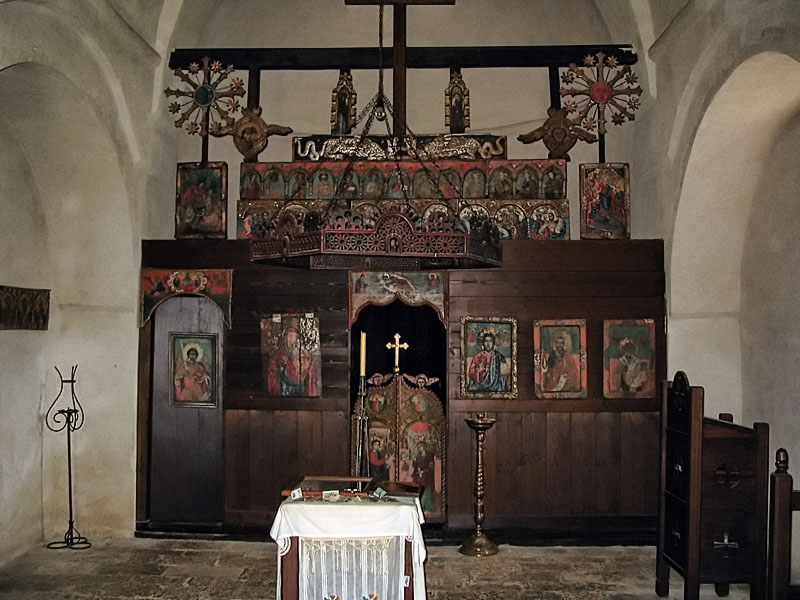
Iconostasis of Saints Peter and Paul Church

Sirogojno Serbian Orthodox church, interior

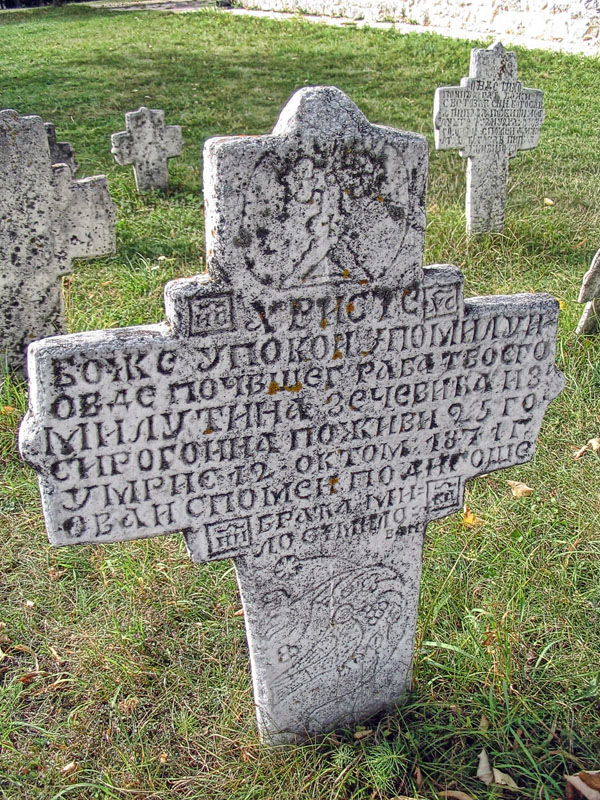
Graveyard outside the church in Sirogojno

== Notable people ==
- Milan Smiljanić (1891–1979), Minister of Agriculture in the Socialist Republic of Serbia (1944-1946).

== See also ==
- Monument of Culture of Exceptional Importance
- Tourism in Serbia
