= Tornik ski resort =

Ski resort in Serbia

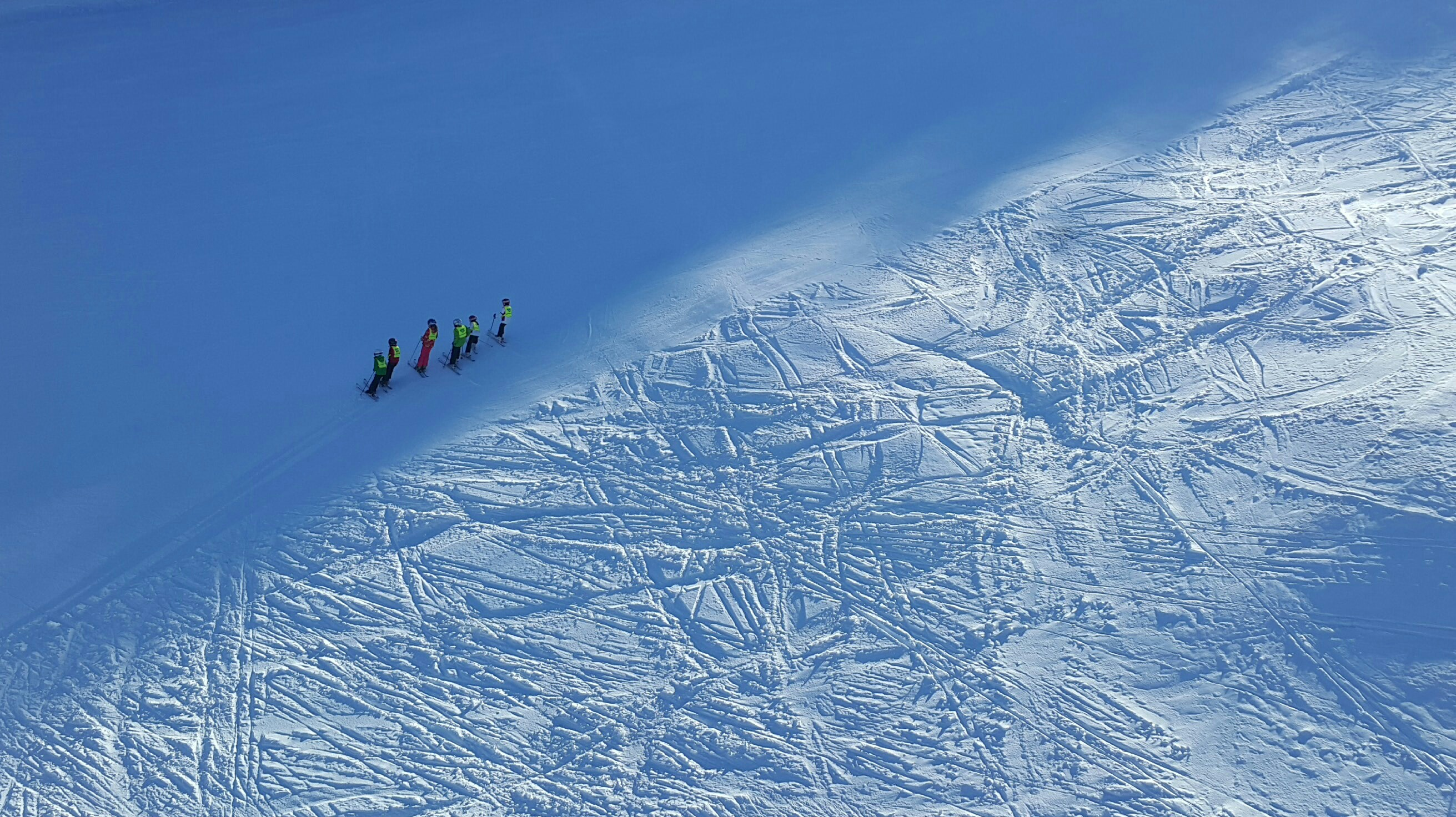
- Ski school in Tornik

- Location within Serbia
- Location: Zlatibor Mountain
- Nearest city: Zlatibor, Čajetina, Serbia
- Coordinates: 43°39′17″N 19°38′21″E
- Top elevation: 1,496 m (4,908 ft)
- Skiable area: 7 km (4.3 mi)
- Trails: 6
- Lift system: 4 total (8-passenger gondola, 6 seater-chairlift and 2 surface lifts)
- Lift capacity: 7,000/hour
- Snowmaking: Yes
- Website: www.skijalistasrbije.rs/sr/o-centru-tornik-zlatibor

Tornik ski resort or Tornik ski center (Serbian: Ски-центар Торник / Ski-centar Tornik) is a mountain resort and one of the largest centers of winter tourism in Serbia, operated by public company "Skijališta Srbije". Located on the slopes of Zlatibor Mountain, it is mainly a destination for skiing. In the nearby town of Zlatibor, there are several hotels and hostels, cafes, bars and night clubs.

== Features ==
It is located at elevations between 1,100 and 1,496 meters on the Tornik peak. It has four tracks, all covered by artificial snowing systems, with the total capacity of the about 5,400 skiers per hour. It is equipped with a six-seater chairlift, carrying 3,000 skiers per hour, and two T-bar ski lifts with total capacity of 2,400 skiers per hour. All four tracks are categorized by the International Ski Federation (FIS).

The ski resort also offers ski polygon, as well as bobsleigh rails and the tubing track. Many of the activities are also active during the summers.

A gondola lift which would span over 9 km (5.6 mi) and connect the town center of Zlatibor with Tornik ski resort is opened in 2020.

== Transportation ==
Tornik ski resort is located some 12 kilometers off the Zlatibor Highway and 15 kilometers from the town of Zlatibor.

== Gallery ==
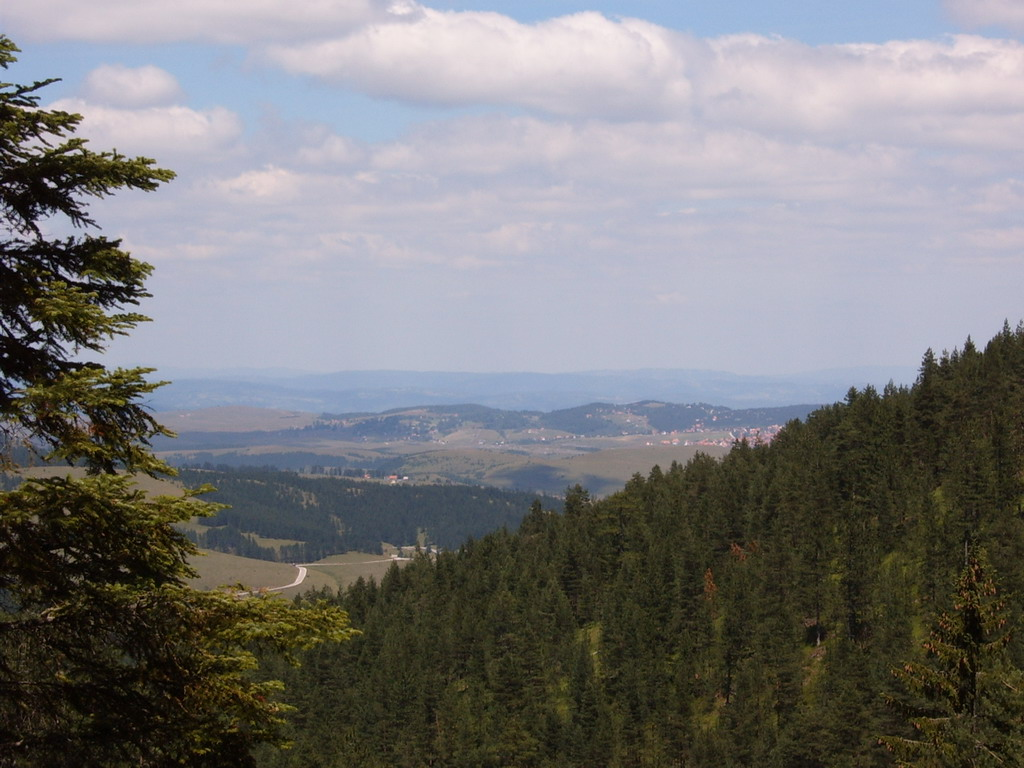
View from Tornik in the summer

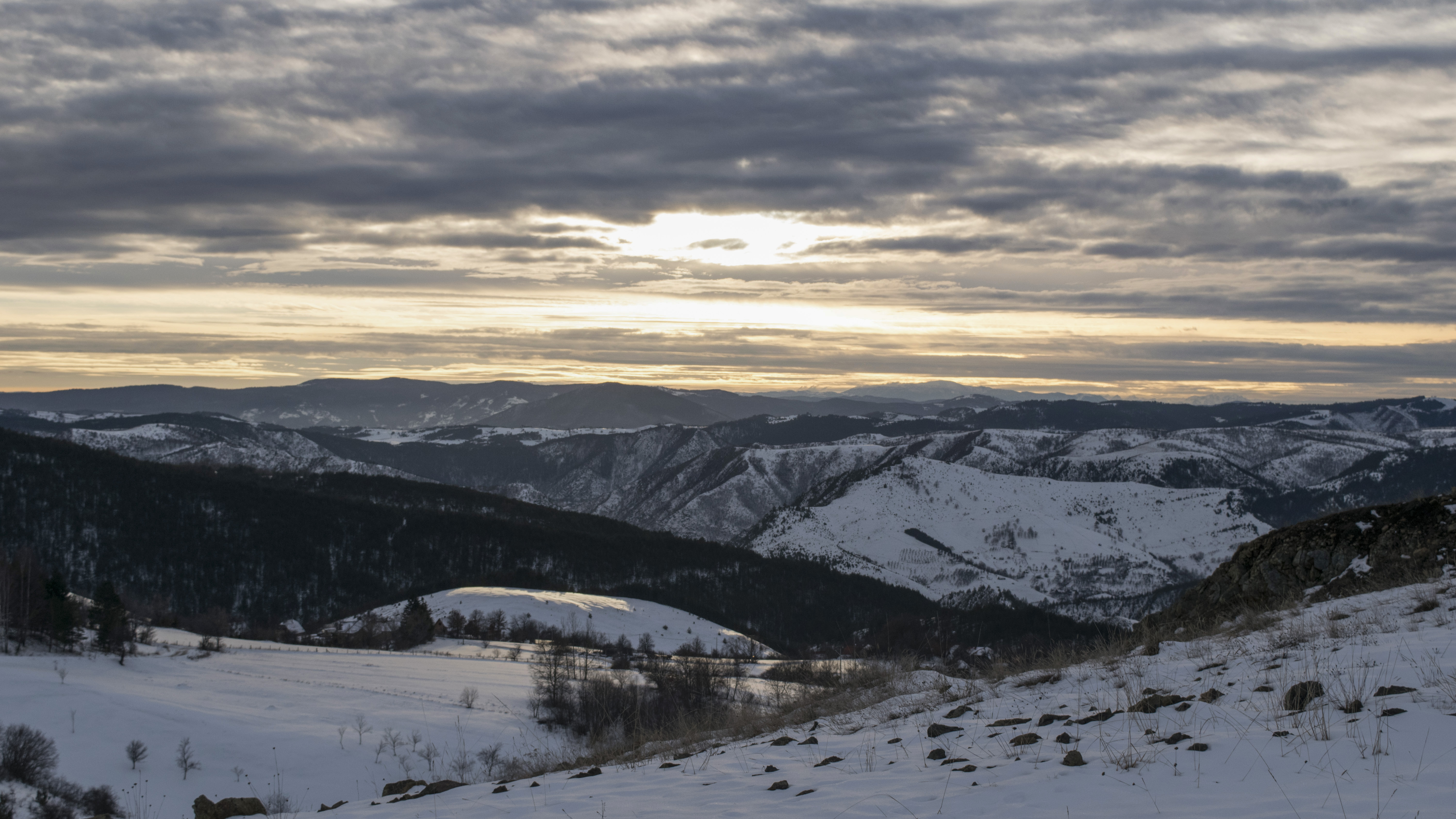
View from Tornik in the winter

Zlatibor landscape

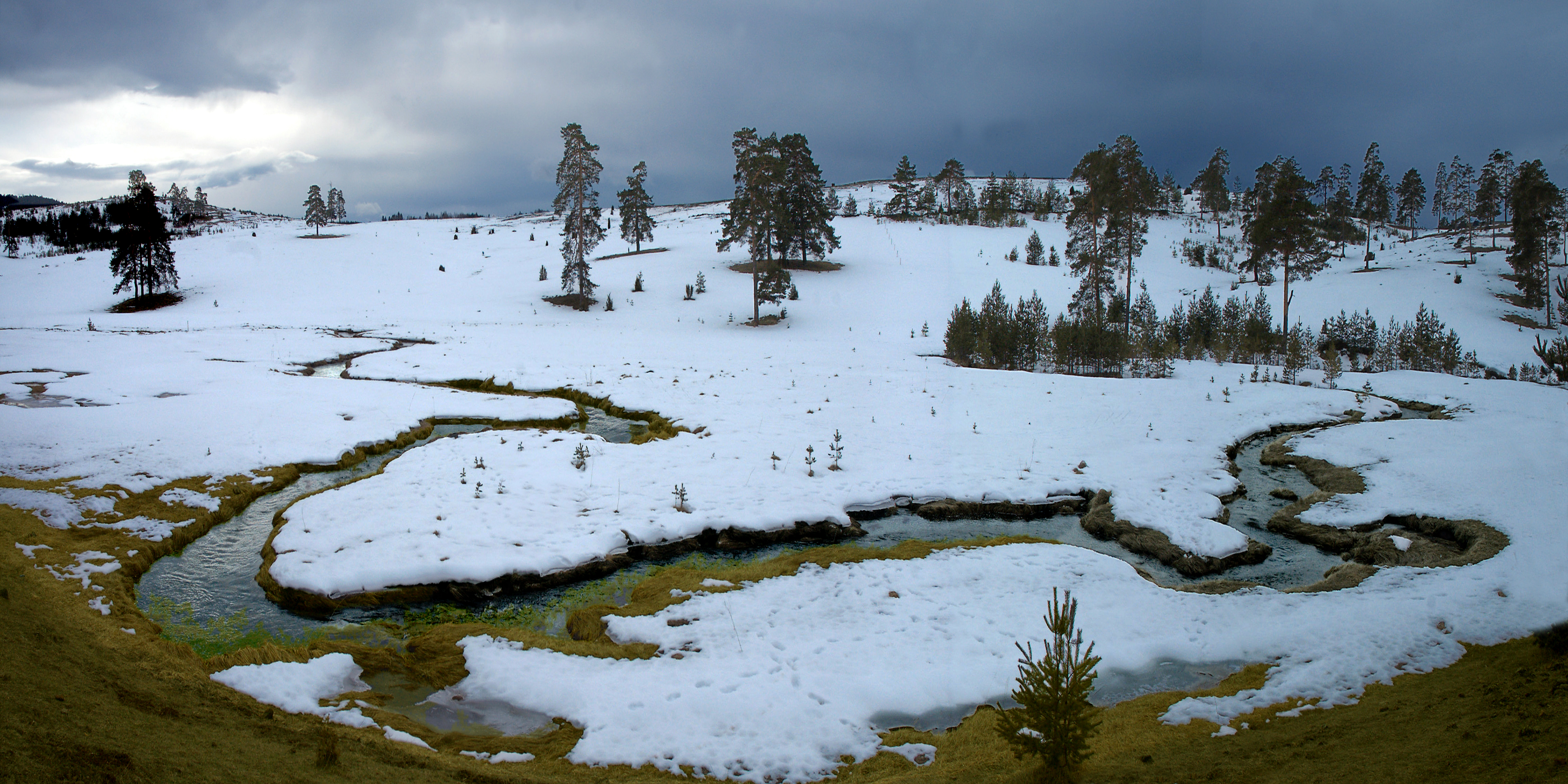
Zlatibor landscape

== See also ==
- Tourism in Serbia
