= Dobroselica (Rekovac) =

- Village
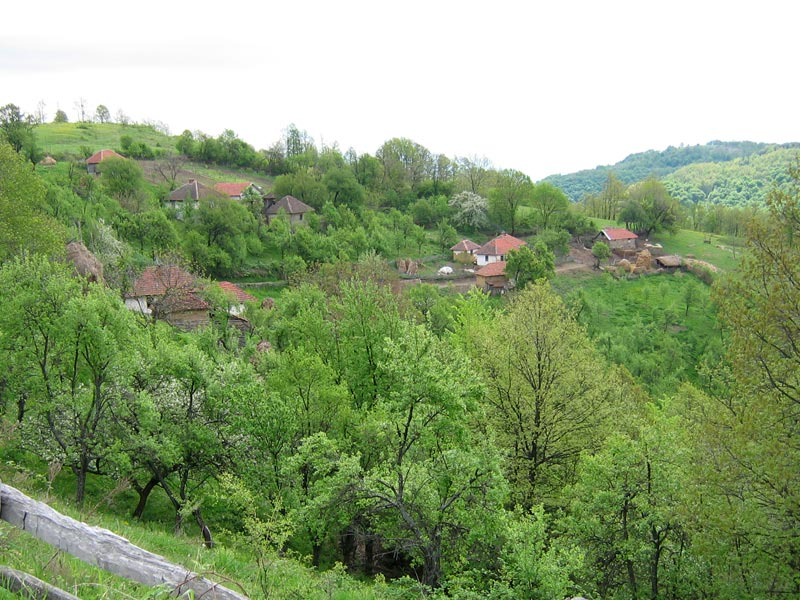
- Dobroselica

- Location within Serbia
- Coordinates: 43°50′13″N 20°58′06″E
- Country: Serbia
- District: Pomoravlje District
- Municipality: Rekovac
- Elevation: 2,130 ft (650 m)

Population (2002)
  - Total: 36
- Time zone: UTC+1 (CET)
  - Summer (DST): UTC+2 (CEST)

Dobroselica is a village in the municipality of Rekovac, Serbia. According to the 2002 census, the village has a population of 36 people.
