= Semegnjevo =

Semegnjevo - kuzelj
- Village
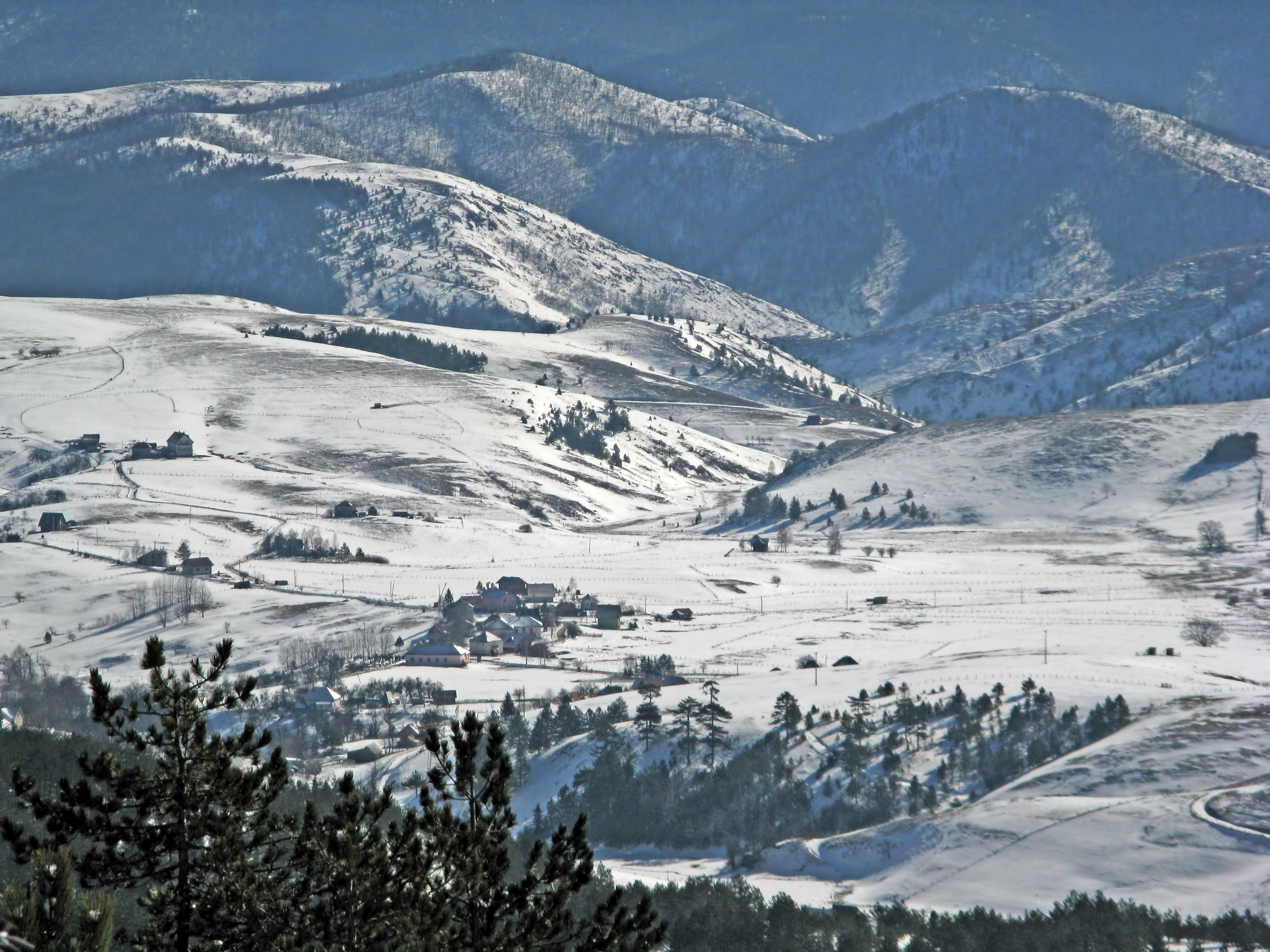
- Mt. Zlatibor and the village of Semegnjevo in winter.

- Location within Serbia
- Coordinates: 43°45′N 19°35′E
- Country: Serbia
- District: Zlatibor District
- Municipality: Čajetina

Area
  - Total: 59.54 km^{2} (22.99 sq mi)
- Elevation: 922 m (3,025 ft)

Population (2011)
  - Total: 183
  - Density: 3.07/km^{2} (7.96/sq mi)
- Time zone: UTC+1 (CET)
  - Summer (DST): UTC+2 (CEST)

Semegnjevo is a village in the municipality of Čajetina, western Serbia. According to the 2011 census, the village has a population of 183 people.
