= Jablanica (Čajetina) =

Jablanica Јабланица
- Village
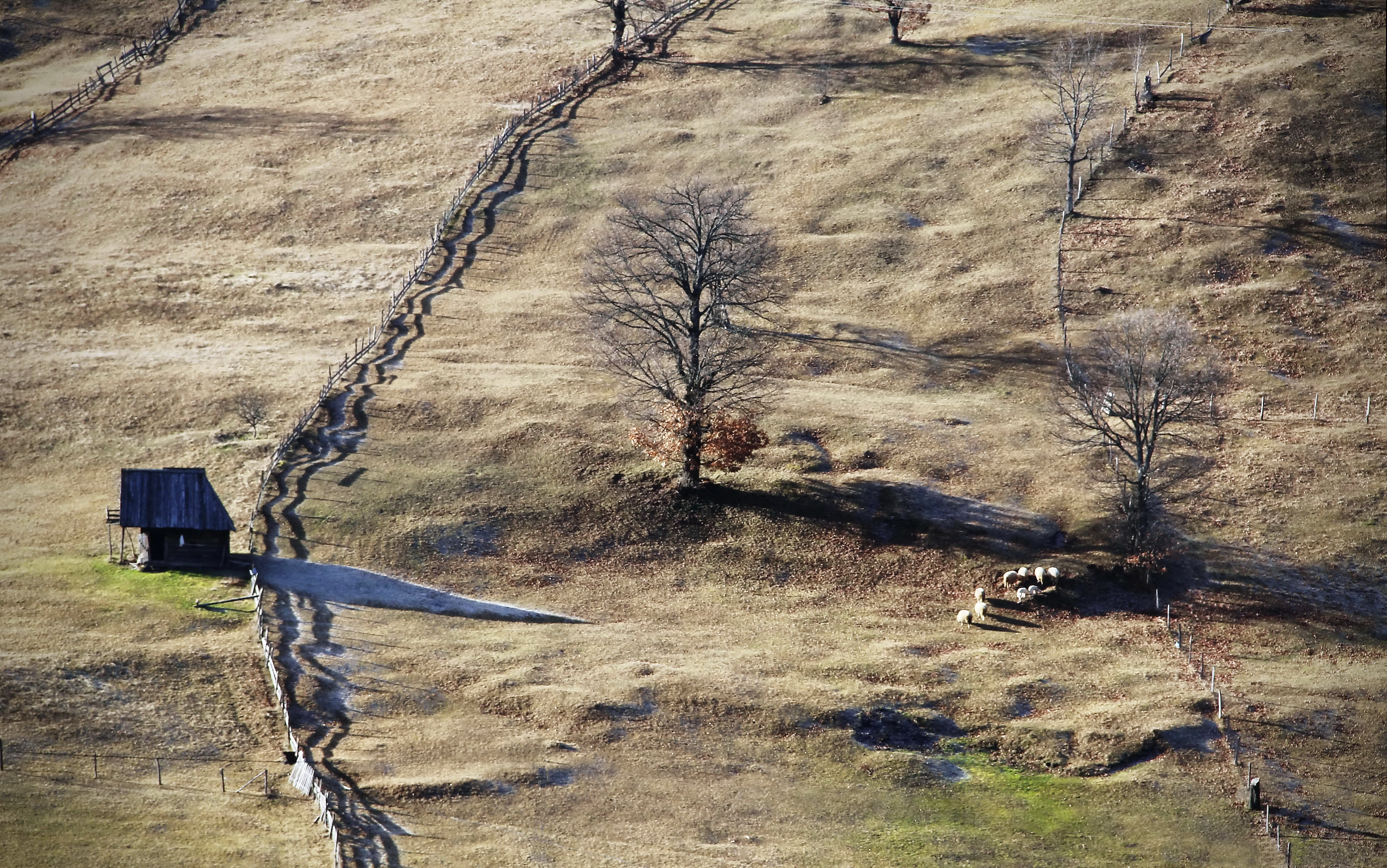
- Jablanica landscape

- Location within Serbia
- Coordinates: 43°39′06″N 19°35′12″E
- Country: Serbia
- District: Zlatibor District
- Municipality: Čajetina

Area
  - Total: 101.28 km^{2} (39.10 sq mi)
- Elevation: 445 m (1,460 ft)

Population (2011)
  - Total: 709
  - Density: 7.00/km^{2} (18.1/sq mi)
- Time zone: UTC+1 (CET)
  - Summer (DST): UTC+2 (CEST)

Jablanica is a village in the municipality of Čajetina, western Serbia. According to the 2011 census, the village has a population of 709 people.
