= Stublo =

- Village
- Location within Serbia
- Coordinates: 43°38′N 19°37′E
- Country: Serbia
- District: Zlatibor District
- Municipality: Čajetina

Area
  - Total: 30.73 km^{2} (11.86 sq mi)
- Elevation: 1,089 m (3,573 ft)

Population (2022)
  - Total: 63
  - Density: 2.1/km^{2} (5.3/sq mi)
- Time zone: UTC+1 (CET)
  - Summer (DST): UTC+2 (CEST)

Stublo is a village in the municipality of Čajetina, western Serbia. According to the 2022 census, the village has a population of 63 people.
