= Rožanstvo =

- Village
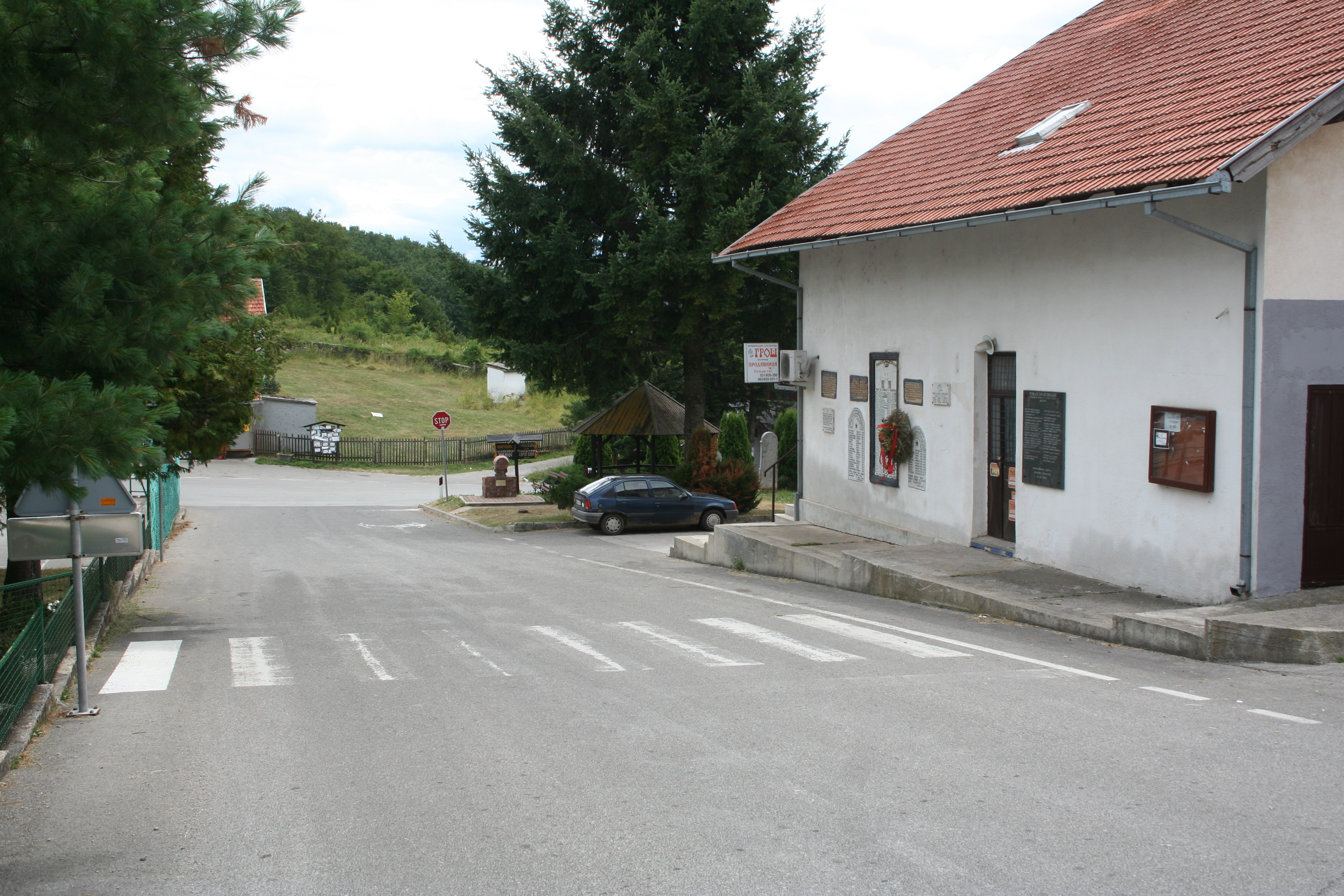

- Location within Serbia
- Coordinates: 43°43′14″N 19°50′04″E
- Country: Serbia
- District: Zlatibor District
- Municipality: Čajetina

Area
  - Total: 18.42 km^{2} (7.11 sq mi)
- Elevation: 828 m (2,717 ft)

Population (2011)
  - Total: 387
  - Density: 21.0/km^{2} (54.4/sq mi)
- Time zone: UTC+1 (CET)
  - Summer (DST): UTC+2 (CEST)

Rožanstvo is a village in the municipality of Čajetina, western Serbia. According to the 2011 census, the village has a population of 387 people.
