= Dobroselica (Čajetina) =

- Village
- Location within Serbia
- Coordinates: 43°38′08″N 19°43′09″E
- Country: Serbia
- District: Zlatibor District
- Municipality: Čajetina

Area
  - Total: 56.88 km^{2} (21.96 sq mi)
- Elevation: 949 m (3,114 ft)

Population (2011)
  - Total: 367
  - Density: 6.45/km^{2} (16.7/sq mi)
- Time zone: UTC+1 (CET)
  - Summer (DST): UTC+2 (CEST)

Dobroselica is a village in the municipality of Čajetina, western Serbia. According to the 2011 census, the village has a population of 367 people.

There is a Serbian Orthodox church in Dobroselica. It is dedicated to Saint Elijah the Prophet.
