= Zlatibor (town) =

Zlatibor Златибор
- Town
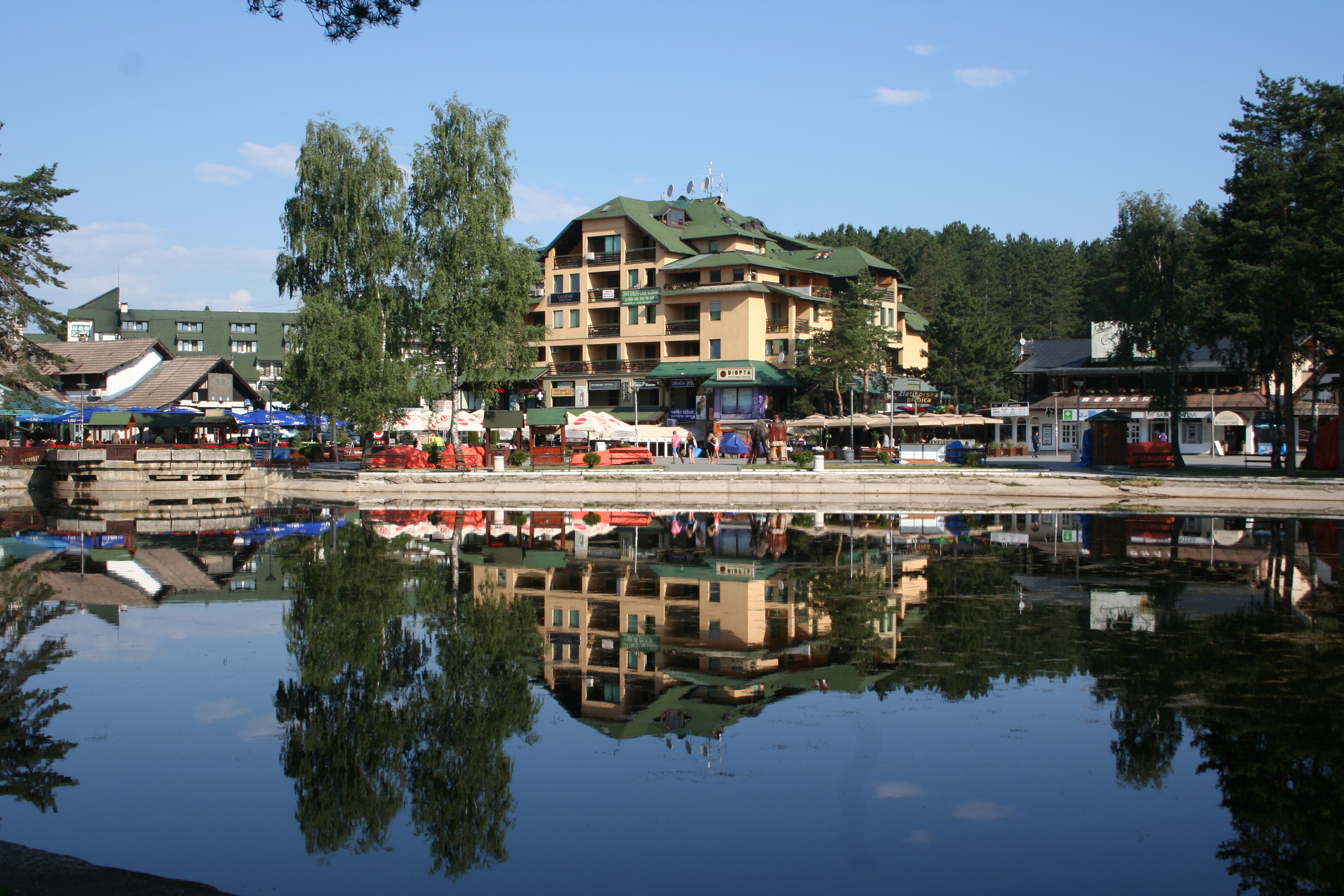
- Lake in the centre of Zlatibor

- Location within Serbia
- Coordinates: 43°43′35″N 19°42′00″E
- Country: Serbia
- Region: Šumadija and Western Serbia
- District: Zlatibor

Government
  - Mayor: Boban Perišić (SNS)

Area
  - Town: 39.32 km^{2} (15.18 sq mi)
- Elevation: 1,010 m (3,310 ft)

Population (2011 census)
  - Town: 2,821
  - Town density: 71.74/km^{2} (185.8/sq mi)
- Time zone: UTC+1 (CET)
  - Summer (DST): UTC+2 (CEST)
- Postal code: 31310
- Area code: +381 31
- Car plates: UE
- Website: www.zlatibor.org.rs

Zlatibor (Serbian Cyrillic: Златибор) is a town located at the namesake mountain in the municipality of Čajetina, western Serbia. As of 2011, the population of the town is 2,821 inhabitants.

It is a popular tourist resort in Serbia. By road and rail it is connected with Užice and Nova Varoš. It lies on the road linking Belgrade with the Montenegrin coast and off the Belgrade–Bar railway.

== Name ==
The city's name means "golden pine" coming from the words "zlati/злати" meaning golden, and "bor/бор" meaning pine

== History ==
The town's original name was Kulaševac. In August 1893, King Aleksandar Obrenović came to Kulaševac (Serbian Cyrillic: Кулашевац), and built a fountain called Kraljeva česma (Краљева чесма, "The King's Fountain"). In honor of King Aleksandar's contribution, Kulaševac was renamed to Kraljeva Voda (Краљева Вода, "The King's Water"). In 1903, King Petar Karađorđević I built a villa on the site, helping strengthen the growing trend of turning the slopes surrounding Kraljeva Voda into a vacation spot. After World War II, Kraljeva Voda was renamed to Partizanske Vode (Партизанске Воде, "The Partisans' Waters") in 1946. The name change was out of respect for wounded Zlatibor Partisans who were murdered by Nazi Germany's army in November and December 1941, while they were recovering in the main hospital of Palisad in the northern part of Kraljeva Voda. In 1995, Partizanske Vode was renamed to Zlatibor, recognizing the mountain upon which the town rests.

The town lies roughly 10 kilometers from Tornik, a mountain summit popular with skiing enthusiasts. A gondola lift which spans over 9 km (5.6 mi) and connects the town center of Zlatibor with Tornik ski resort was opened in December 2020.

== See also ==
- Cities and towns in Serbia
- Populated places of Serbia
