= Rugby union in Bulgaria =

- Country: Bulgaria
- Governing body: Bulgarian Rugby Federation
- National team: Bulgaria
- First played: 1950s
- Registered players: 3026
- Clubs: 36

National competitions
- Rugby World Cup; Rugby World Cup Sevens; IRB Sevens World Series; European Nations Cup

Rugby union in Bulgaria is a minor but growing sport. Bulgaria is ranked 90th worldwide by the International Rugby Board (IRB) as of 8 October 2007. There are 3,026 Bulgarian rugby players.

== Governing body ==
Rugby union in Bulgaria is governed by the Bulgarian Rugby Federation, which was formed in 1962.

== History ==
Bulgarian rugby is centred on the capital, Sofia.

Although rugby was well organised in Bulgaria during the 1960s, the first international was not until 1976, when Bulgaria lost to Czechoslovakia.

Bulgarian rugby has not traditionally enjoyed a high reputation. For example, in 1988, an anonymous French rugby official joked that "one of the FIRA nightmares... is to have Yugoslavia playing Bulgaria refereed by a Soviet."

Rugby union like many other sports, was long to be connected in the public mind with the less savoury aspects of Communism:

"In fact, since the end of the Second World War, the East European (and world communist) sports system was dominated by clubs of the security forces (often in Eastern Europe bearing the Soviet name Dinamo) and the armed forces. Most sports heroes, therefore, have officially been soldiers or police officers, guardians of public order and role models for a disciplined, obedient and patriotic citizenry. So to many people, élite sport was identified with paramilitary coercion."

However, in more recent times, the spirit of Bulgarian rugby has been applauded by none other than England rugby great Will Greenwood:

"In the end we beat Pernik in a hard-fought match that left us all with souvenirs of our trip. And while the bruises will fade, my memory of Bulgaria will not. On a national level they may be miles away from rugby recognition, but far from the spotlight and in among the old towns there are thousands of Bulgarians who absolutely love our sport."

== Women's rugby ==
Although Bulgaria's women have not yet played test match rugby, they have been playing international sevens rugby since 2003. (Current playing record).

== Teams ==
Although Bulgaria as a national side are low in the IRB rankings, Bulgaria has a long rugby tradition, and many of the country's clubs were formed as far back as the 1960s.

The main clubs are :

- Murphy's Misfits (Sofia) - an expatriates' social rugby team
- Valyatzite "The Steamrollers" (Pernik)
- Mercury (Sofia)
- National Sports Academy (Sofia)
- Lokomotiv (Sofia)
- Levski (Sofia)
- Varna (Varna)
- Balkanski Kotki "Balkan Cats" (Berkovitsa)
- Yantra (Gabrovo)

Other clubs include :

Chimik "Chemical Worker" (Kostinbrod)
Divi Ihtimanski Kotki "Wild Cats of Ihtiman" (Ihtiman)
Granit (Godech)
Sportist (Svoge)
Krakra (Pernik)
Pastra (Petarch)
Vulchedrumski Tigri "Tigers of Vulchedrum" (Vulchedrum/Valchedram)
Nadezhda 2001 (Nadezhda, Sofia)
Beroe (Stara Zagora)
Botev (Bourgas)
Spartak (Pleven)
Orlite "The Eagles" (Svilengrad)
Chorni RFC (Breznik)
