= Delyan, Sofia Province =

Coordinates: 42°45.5′N 23°0.25′E

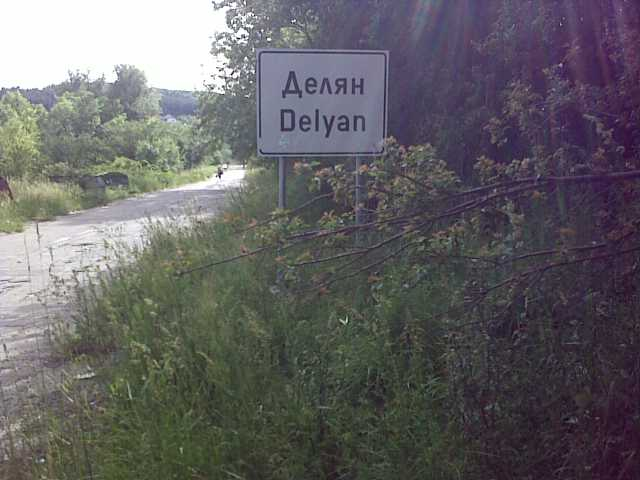
Sign in front of the village

Delyan (Bulgarian: Делян) is a village in Bozhurishte Municipality of Sofia Province, western Bulgaria, near the town of Breznik. The old historic name of the village is Karnul (Bulgarian: Кърнул). As of 2007, the village has only 18 permanent inhabitants. Delyan is located in the municipality of Bozhurishte, 34 km west of Sofia on the eastern slopes of Viskyar Mountain with an average altitude of 790 meters. Its houses are nestled in a valley between three small peaks of Viskyar. It is named after the leader of the Bulgarian uprising against the Byzantine Empire (1040-1041) and for a short time Tsar (Emperor) of Bulgaria, Peter II Delyan. Administratively, the village is connected to the nearby village Zlatusha to which there is a tarmac road, built in early 1970s. It is close to the railroad Pernik-Voluyak, on the border between Sofia Province and Pernik Province, and nearby Dogandzhia (Falconer), a remote neighborhood of Goz is in the Breznik Municipality. The village consists of 3 neighborhoods: Matsina and Rebrachka Mahala to the north of center, and Vanchina Mahala to the south of center. The Church of St Mary, funded and built by local people on a hill near Delyan, was opened in the spring of 2008. To the south-west of Delyan, in the locality Ormana, there is a pine forest, planted in the 1970s. During favorable seasons, one can find there edible mushrooms, like saffron milk cap (Lactarius deliciosus) and sticky bun (Suillus luteus). Delyan is the birthplace of the writer Spas Antonov.

== History ==
The village exists in today's place from time immemorial. Artefacts, such as old coins and relics of pottery are found when laying the foundations of newly built houses. Many residents of the village joined the rebel forces of Peter II Delyan in the spring of 1040, when the village numbered more than 200 houses. Many of them died in the fighting near Skopje and Thessaloniki. After the betrayal of Peter Delyan's cousin Alusiyan, the rebel forces were defeated. At the pressure of the Byzantine Army, most of the remaining men in the village went to help the boyar Botko who defended Sredets (Sofia) from his fortress above the village of Boyana. The fall of Boyana fortress at the end of 1041 marked the complete suppression of the uprising. Shortly thereafter, in honour of Peter Delyan, in the countryside near the river, a monastery was built and named after Peter Delyan – Petrovo Manastirishte (Peter's Monastery). Later, because of funeral rites performed by priests in the cemetery, it was renamed Popovitsa.

Mеn of the village also participated in the second uprising against Byzantium led by the boyar Georgi Voyteh in 1072 and in the liberation uprising against Byzantine domination led by the brothers Peter and Asen in 1185, when the Second Bulgarian Empire was founded.

At the beginning of Ottoman rule around 1397 because of disobedience and rebellion, the villagers were killed to the last man, the monastery was fully destroyed, and the village was burned. Old Ottoman registers write that in 1446 Karnul village was a timar (domain) of Mehmed, the son of Kyoseto Hadzha, it had 6 households and gave annual income of 410 akche to the feudal. It can be supposed that these 6 households constituted the young men who managed to escape in the Breznik villages Rebro, Noevtsi, Goz, and Babitsa, and later (about 1415) returned to the village which began its second life. The last Turkish feudal who owned land in the village was Karnul bey, who sold his land and left in mid-19th century.

During the Battle of Slivnitsa, and more specifically, at the Battle of Gurgulyat on 7 November 1885, the Serbian Morava Division deployed in a semicircle from Radulovtsi to Delyan (Karnul), with the latter especially taken by the right (cavalry) flank and was defeated by the Bulgarian Army.

On August 14, 1934, Karnul was renamed to Delyan. Then there were about 50 houses. During socialism most people migrated to Sofia and Pernik. During the 1970s, with volunteer help, the bare hill above the village was planted with pine forest. In 1983, the wide asphalt road Sofia-Breznik which passes the village was completed, and later a bus service was opened. Over 40 new concrete houses were built after that. Most of their inhabitants live in Sofia and Pernik and come to the village in holidays.
