= Bozhurishte Municipality =

Coordinates: 42°45′N 23°12′E

Bozhurishte Municipality Община Божурище (Bulgarian)
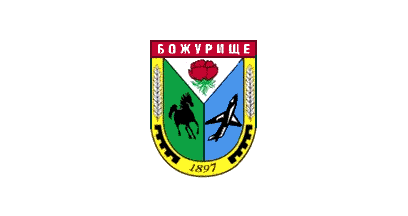
- Flag

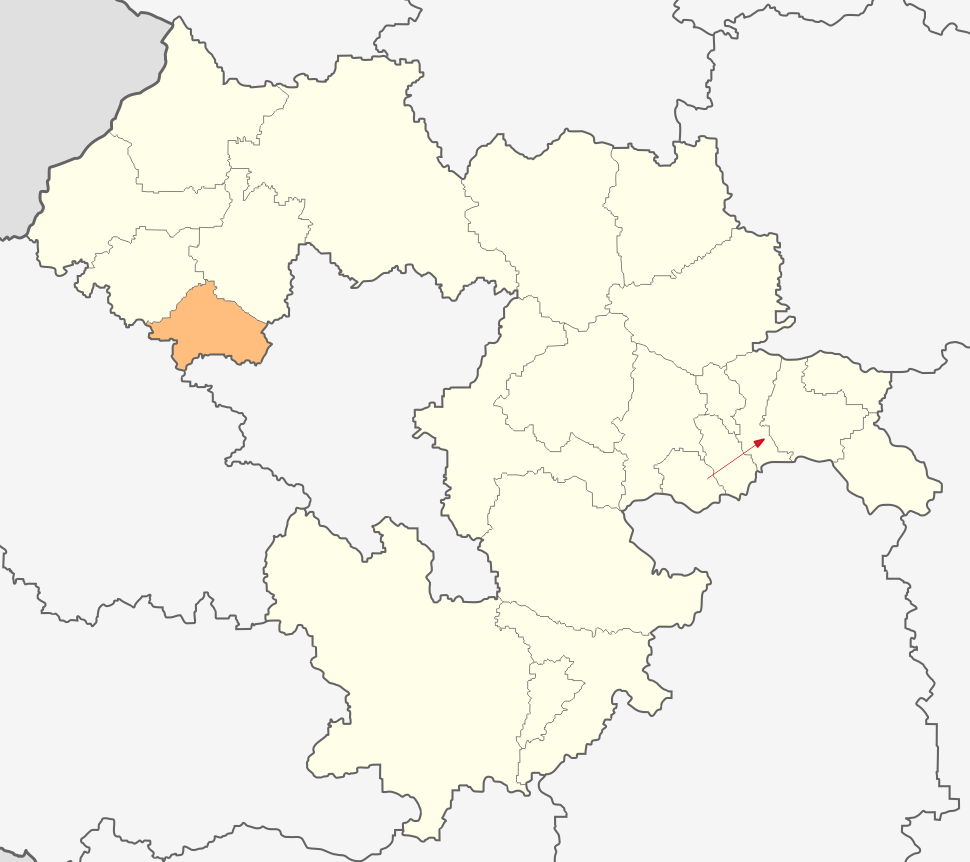
- Country: Bulgaria
- Province: Sofia Province
- Seat: Bozhurishte

Area
  - Total: 142.9 km^{2} (55.2 sq mi)

Population (2025-12-31)
  - Total: 9,318
  - Density: 65.21/km^{2} (168.9/sq mi)
- Website: www.bozhurishte.bg

Bozhurishte Municipality (Bulgarian: Община Божурище) is a municipality in Sofia Province, western Bulgaria. Covering a territory of 142.9 km^{2}, it is the seventeenth largest of the 22 municipalities in the province, encompassing 2.02% of its total area. It borders the municipalities of Slivnitsa to the northwest, Kostinbrod to the northeast, both in Sofia Province, Stolichna in Sofia City Province to the east and south, Pernik to the southwest and Breznik to the west, the latter two in Pernik Province.

== Geography ==
The relief of the municipality is flat, hilly and low-mountainous. Its northern and northeastern reaches constitute the western part of the Sofia Valley, where the municipality’s lowest altitude is situated — 548 m. To the southwest the terrain becomes hilly, gradually rising in elevation until it reaches the foothills of the small mountain ranges of Viskyar and Lyulin. The highest point is the summit of Forta (1,024 m) in Lyulin, situated southeast of the village of Mala Rakovitsa at the border with Pernik Municipality. The average altitude is 770 m.

Bozhurishte Municipality falls within the temperate continental climatic zone with an average temperature of 10 °C. Its whole territory is drained by several right tributaries of the river Blato, a left tributary of the Iskar of the Danube drainage. The mean annual precipitation is 638 mm.

== Demographics ==
Historical population
Year	Pop.	±%
1946	9,049	—
1956	7,717	−14.7%
1965	8,209	+6.4%
1975	8,851	+7.8%
1985	8,628	−2.5%
1992	7,453	−13.6%
2001	7,985	+7.1%
2011	8,473	+6.1%
2021	9,463	+11.7%

The population is 9,318 as of 2025.

There are nine villages and one town in Bozhurishte Municipality:

- Bozhurishte
- Delyan
- Gurmazovo
- Herakovo
- Hrabarsko
- Mala Rakovitsa
- Pozharevo
- Prolesha
- Rosoman
- Zlatusha

== Transport ==
Bozhurishte Municipality is traversed by three roads of the national network with a total length of 46.1 km, including an 8 km section of the Europe motorway (A6) that connects the capital Sofia with the Bulgaria–Serbia border, a 13.8 km stretch of the first class I-8 road Kalotina–Sofia–Plovdiv–Kapitan Andreevo, and the last 24.3 km of the third class III-638 road between Breznik and Bozhurishte.

It is traversed by a 23.1 km section of railway line No. 6 Voluyak–Pernik–Kyustendil–Gyueshevo.

== Gallery ==
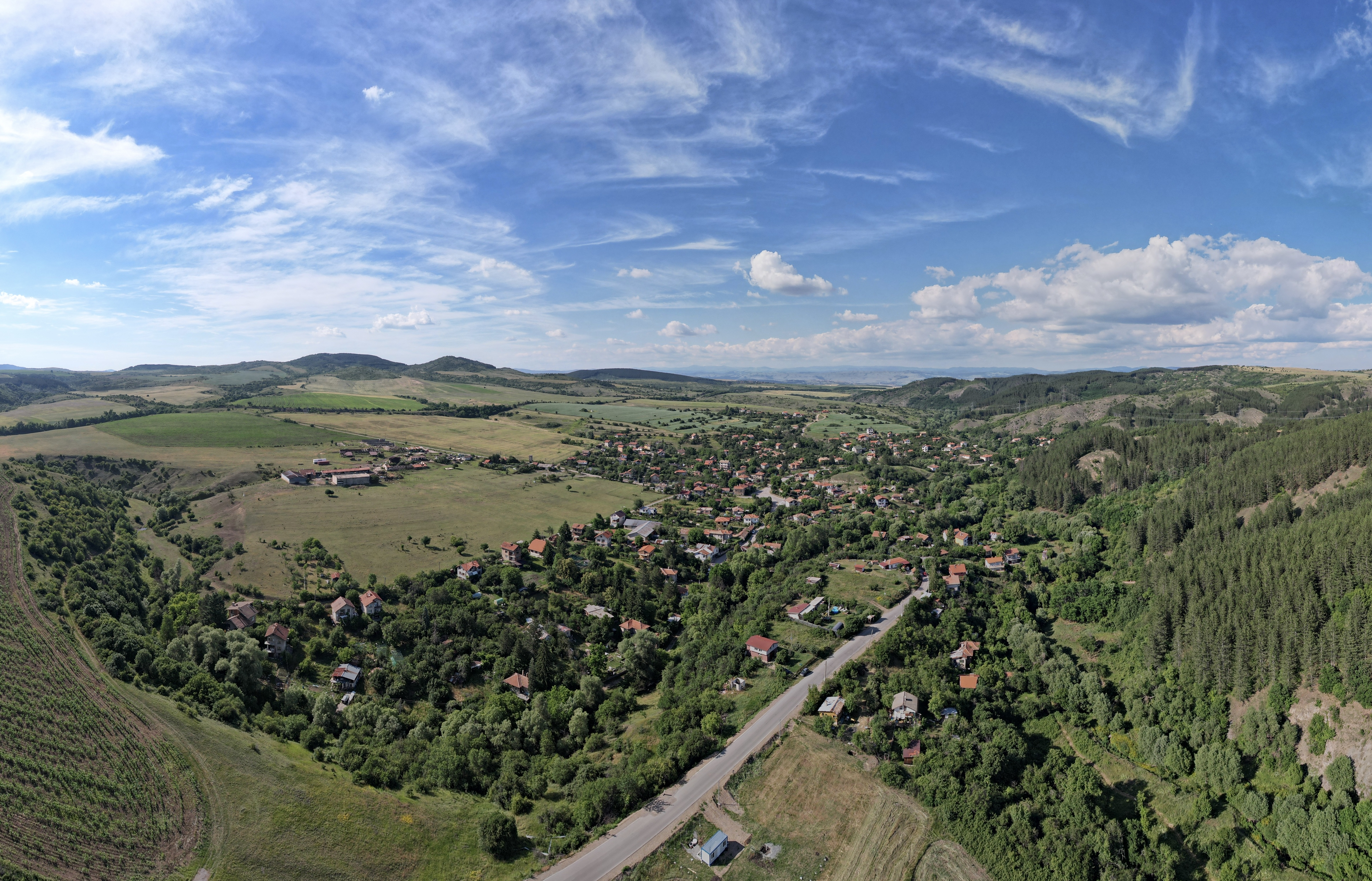
A view of Zlatusha

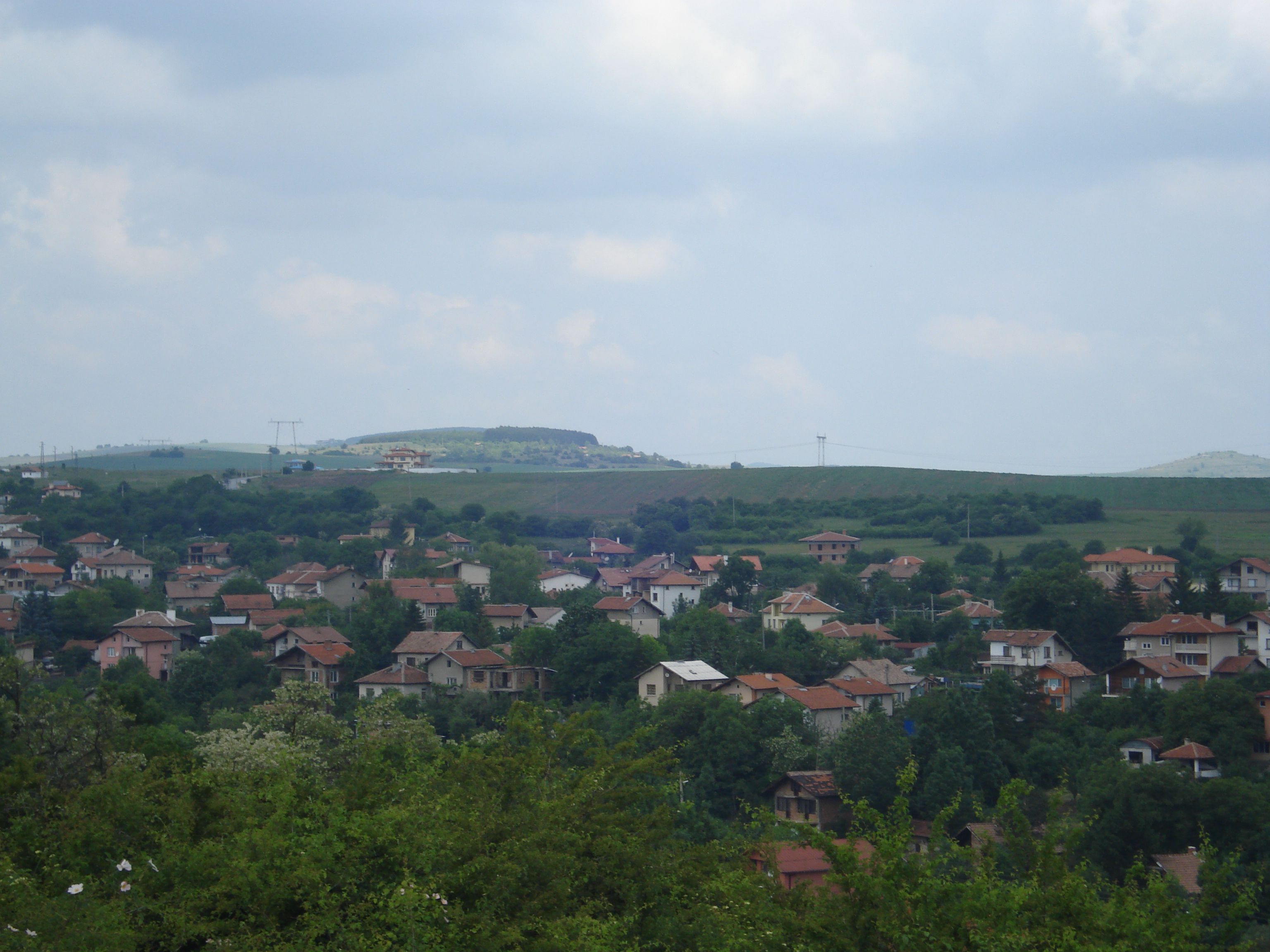
A view of Gurmazovo

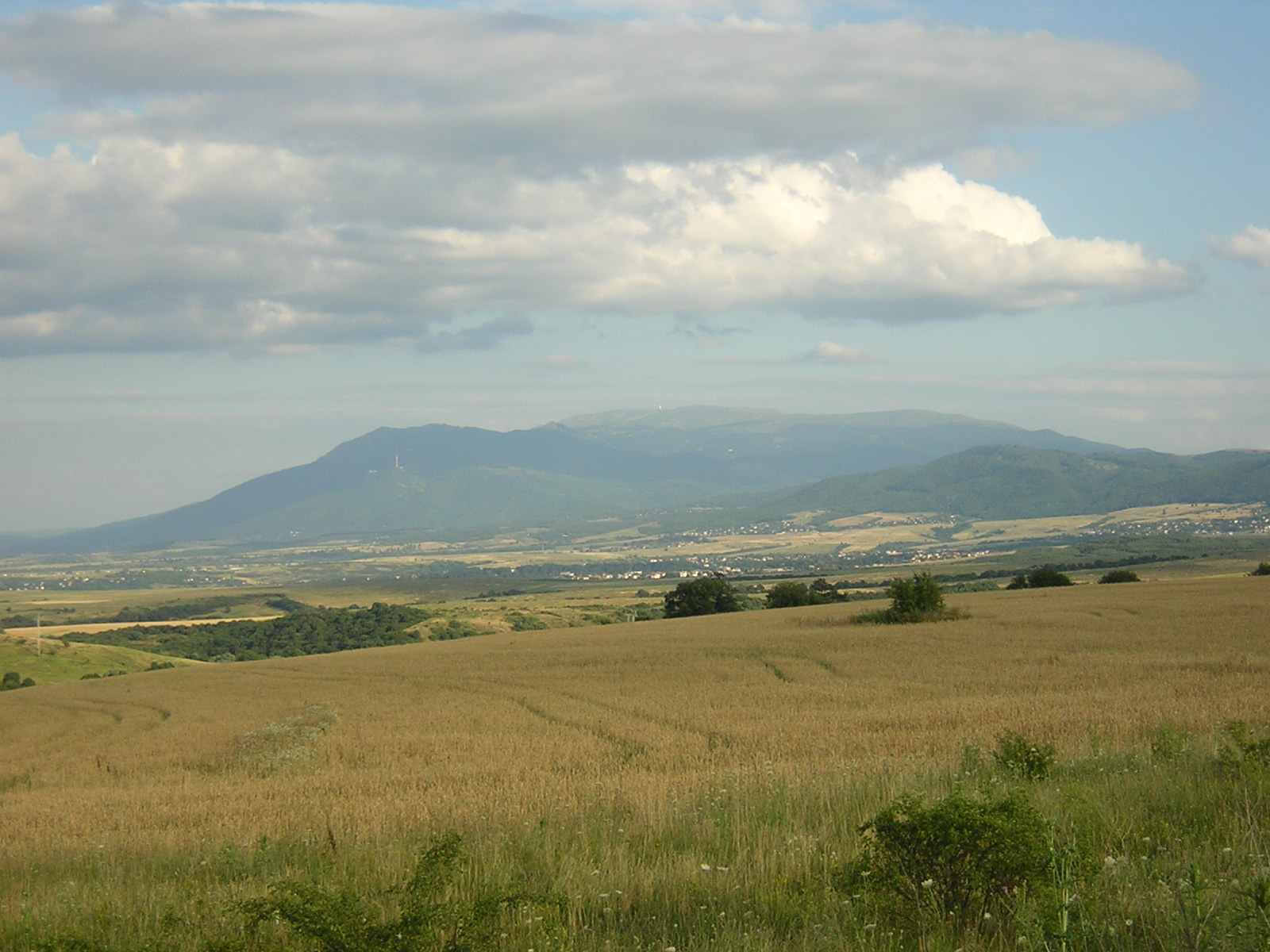
A view of Sofia Valley from Pozharevo

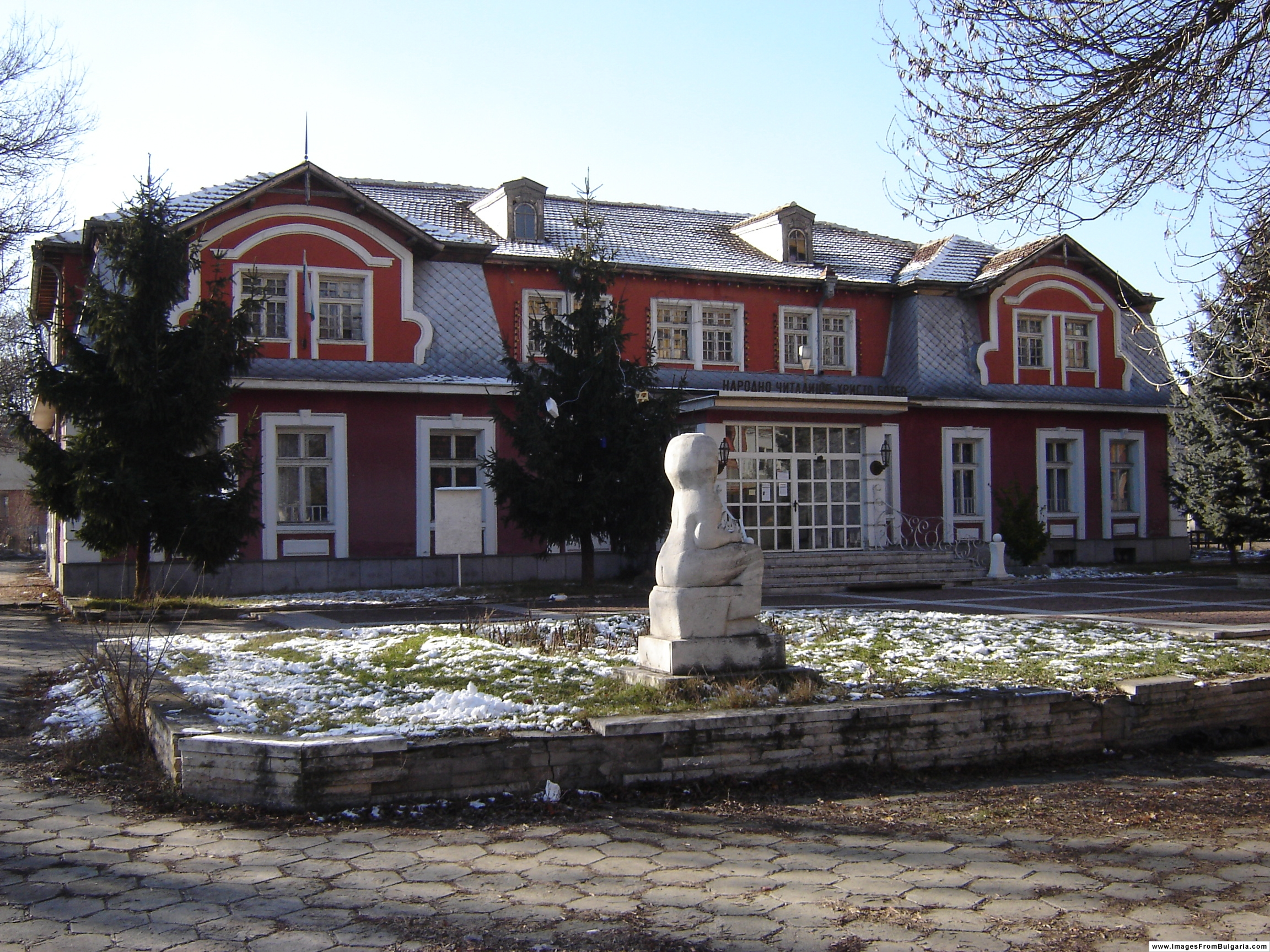
The chitalishte of Bozhurishte
