= Voluyak =

- Village
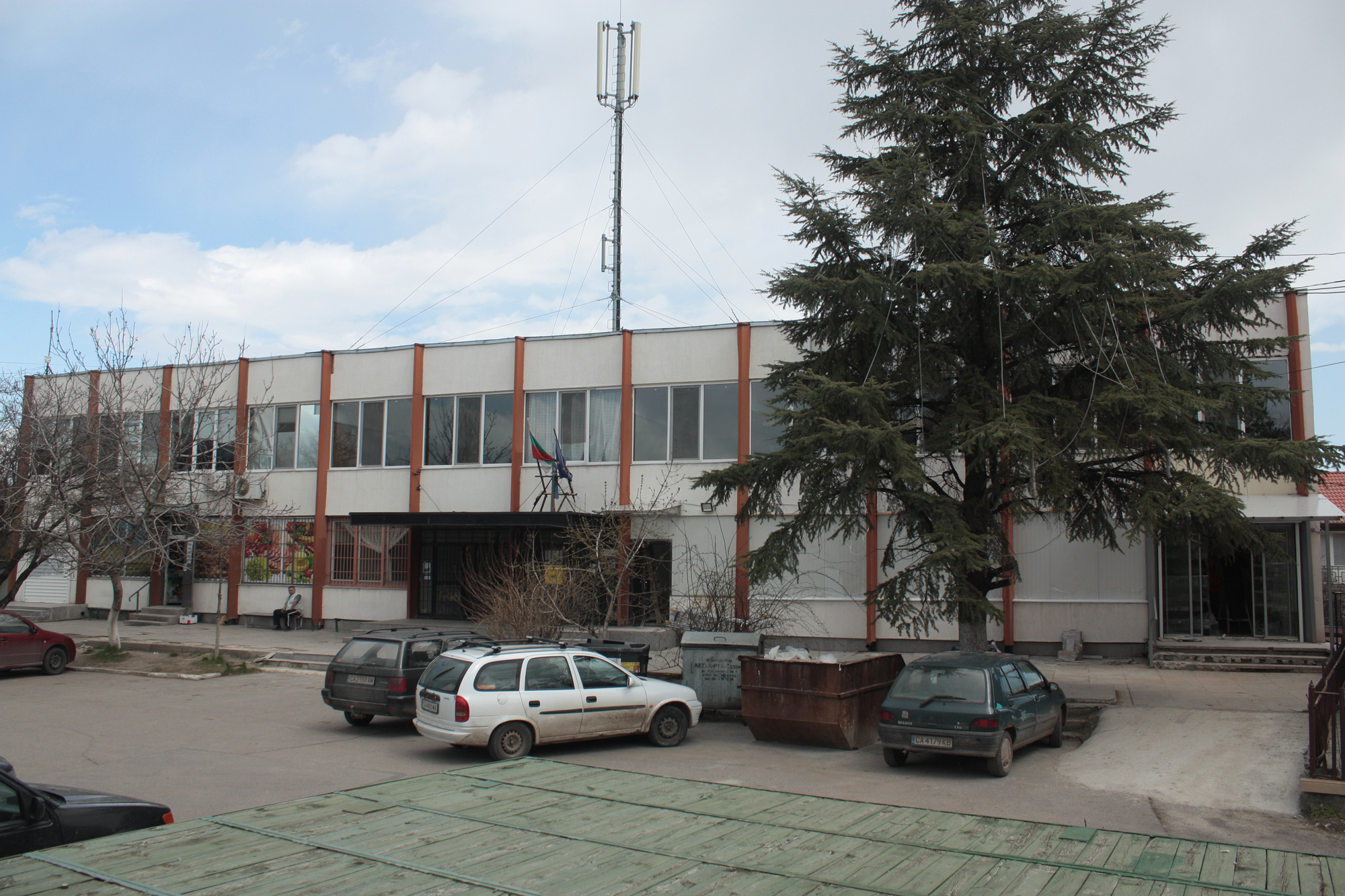
- Village hall

- Location within Bulgaria
- Coordinates: 42°46′21.83″N 23°14′34.48″E
- Country: Bulgaria
- Province: Sofia City
- Municipality: Stolichna Municipality
- Elevation: 535 m (1,755 ft)

Population (2024)
  - Total: 2,746
- Time zone: UTC+2 (EET)
  - Summer (DST): UTC+3 (EEST)
- Postal code: 1346

Voluyak (Bulgarian: Волуяк) is a village in Vrabnitsa district of the Bulgarian capital Sofia, located some 10 km northwest of the city center. As of 2024 it has 2,746 inhabitants.

== Geography ==
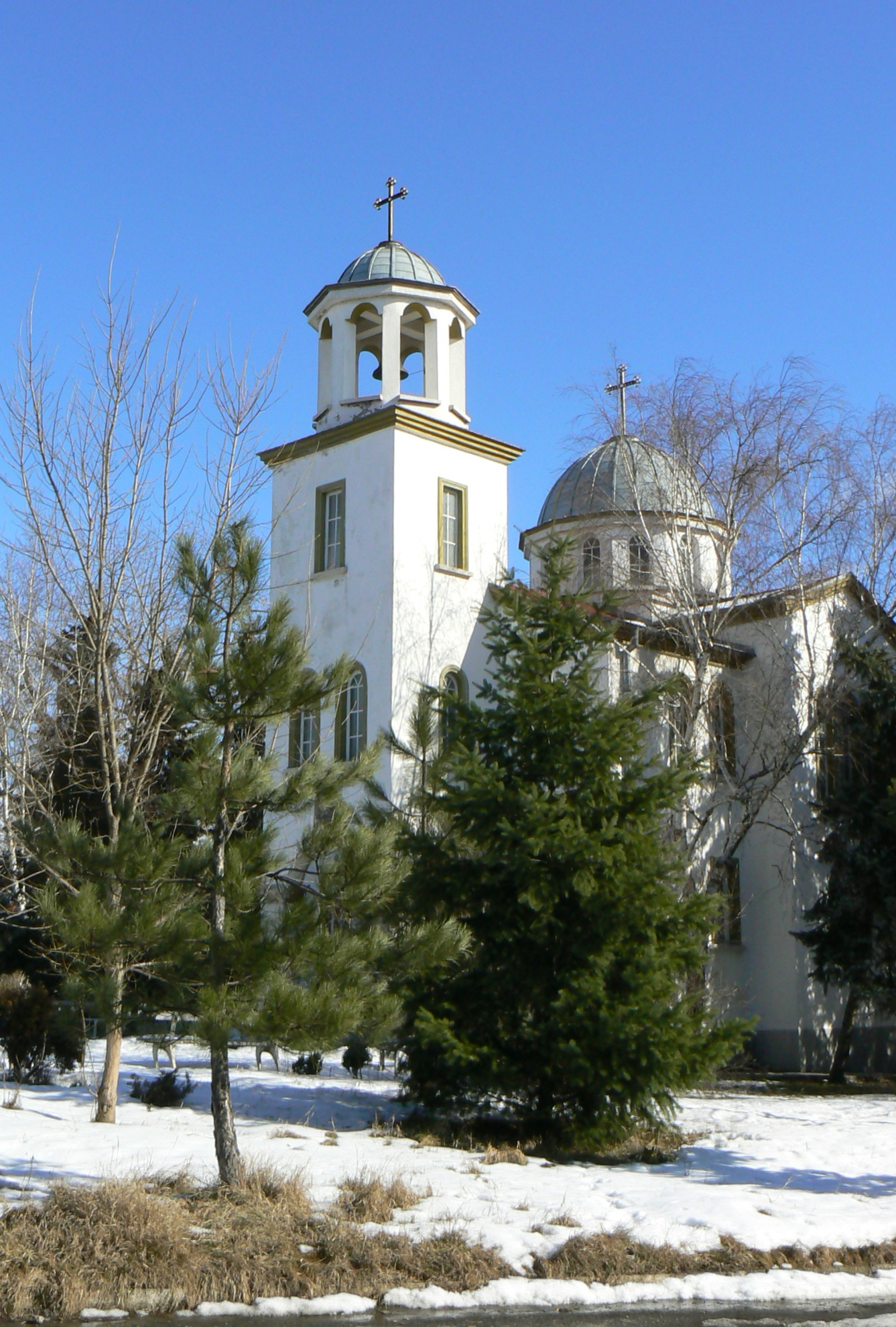
The Church of St George

The village is situated at an altitude of 535 m in the central part of the Sofia Valley, lying south of the river Blato, a left tributary of the Iskar. It falls within the transitional continental climatic zone. The soils are smolnitsi.

Administratively, Voluyak is part of the Vrabnitsa district of Stolichna Municipality in the northwestern part of the Sofia City Province. It has a territory of 18.155 km^{2}. The closest settlements are the village of Mramor to the northeast, the city of Sofia to the southeast, the town of Bozhurishte to the southwest and the town of Kostinbrod to the northwest.

== Transport ==
Voluyak is an important transport hub in the northwest of Sofia. It lies just outside the Sofia Ring Road on the junction between Europe motorway (A6) and the second class II-81 road Sofia–Montana–Lom. Close to the Voluyak Railway Station along the main railway line No. 1 Kalotina–Sofia–Plovdiv–Kapitan Andreevo is the starting point of the two railway branches, heading to Pernik and Bankya respectively.

== History and culture ==
The area of the village has been inhabited since Antiquity, as it was strategically situated along the Roman road Via Militaris. From there, a road used to branch off for the important town of Pautalia, modern Kyustendil. The first mention of the name Voluyak dates from Ottoman judicial registers from 1576.

The first school in the village was established in 1896. There are three churches, the oldest one is dedicated to St Petka of Tarnovo and also dates from 1880. The local cultural center, known in Bulgarian as a chitalishte, was founded in 1921 and is named Izgrev, meaning “dawn”.
