= Mramor, Sofia City Province =

Mramor
- Village
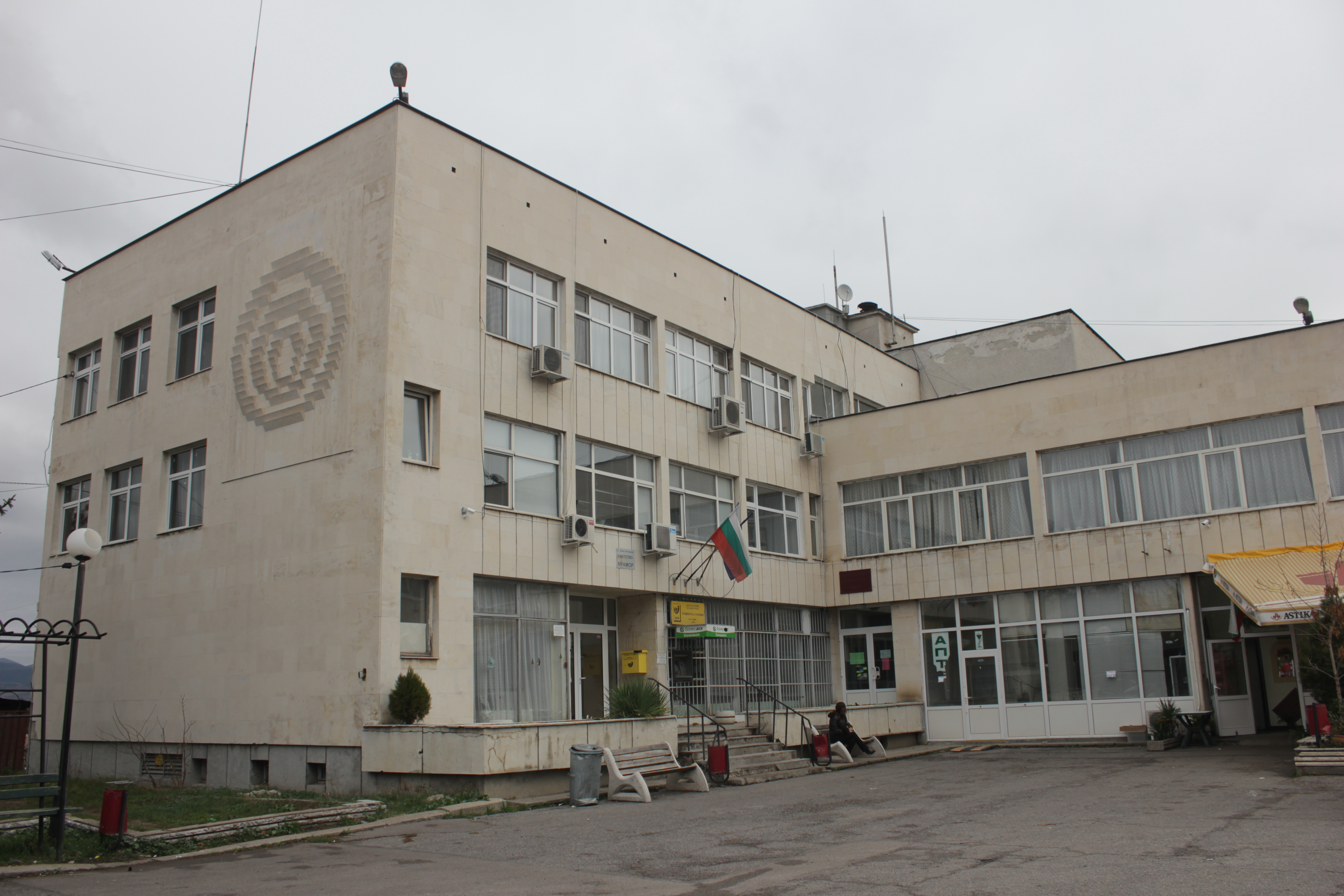
- The village hall

- Location within Bulgaria
- Coordinates: 42°47′10.66″N 23°16′21.76″E
- Country: Bulgaria
- Province: Sofia City
- Municipality: Stolichna Municipality
- Elevation: 526 m (1,726 ft)

Population (2024)
  - Total: 1,958
- Time zone: UTC+2 (EET)
  - Summer (DST): UTC+3 (EEST)
- Postal code: 1261

Mramor (Bulgarian: Мрамор, lit. 'marble') is a village in Vrabnitsa district of the Bulgarian capital Sofia, located some 10 km northwest of the city center. As of 2024 it has 1,958 inhabitants.

== Geography ==
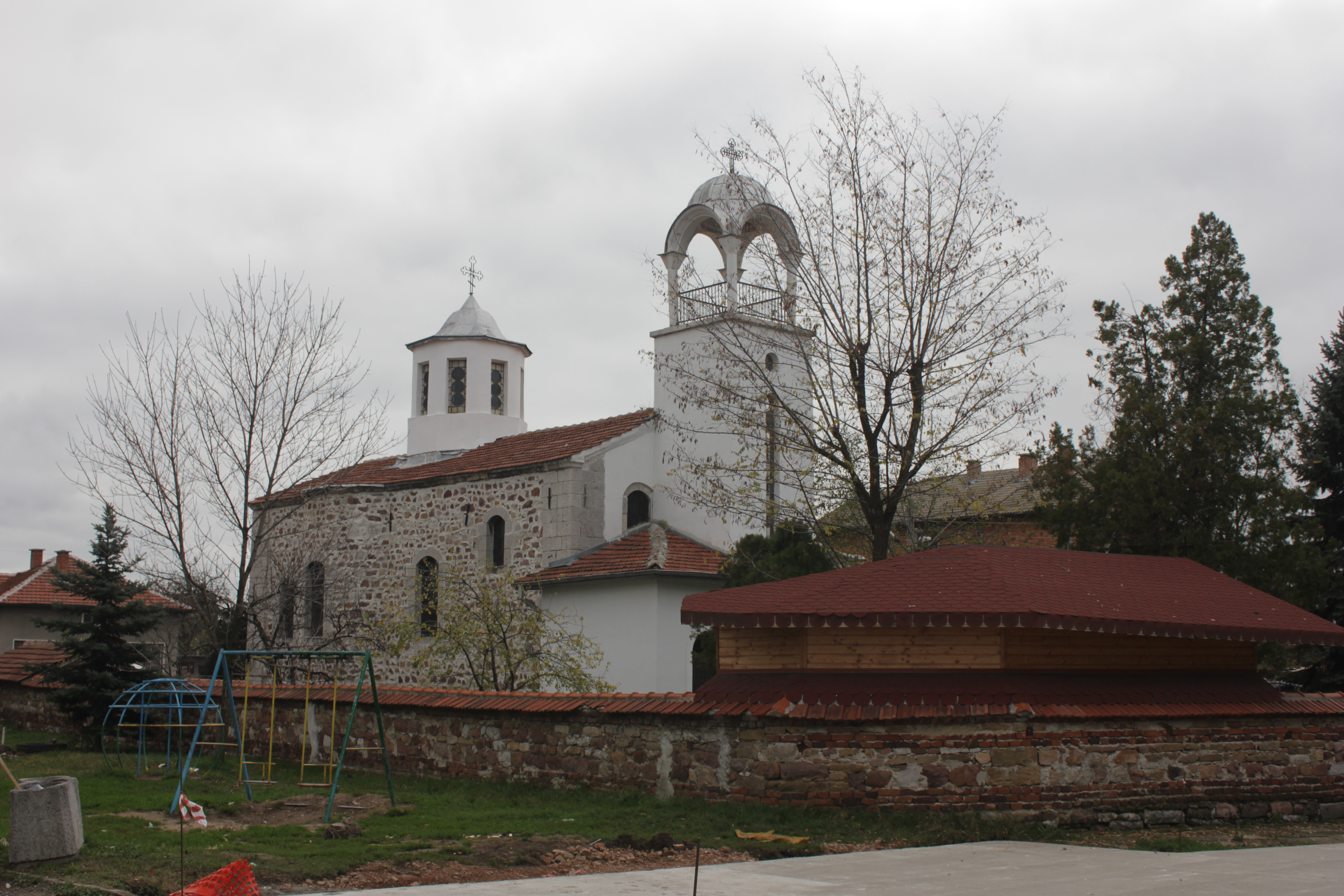
The Church of All Saints

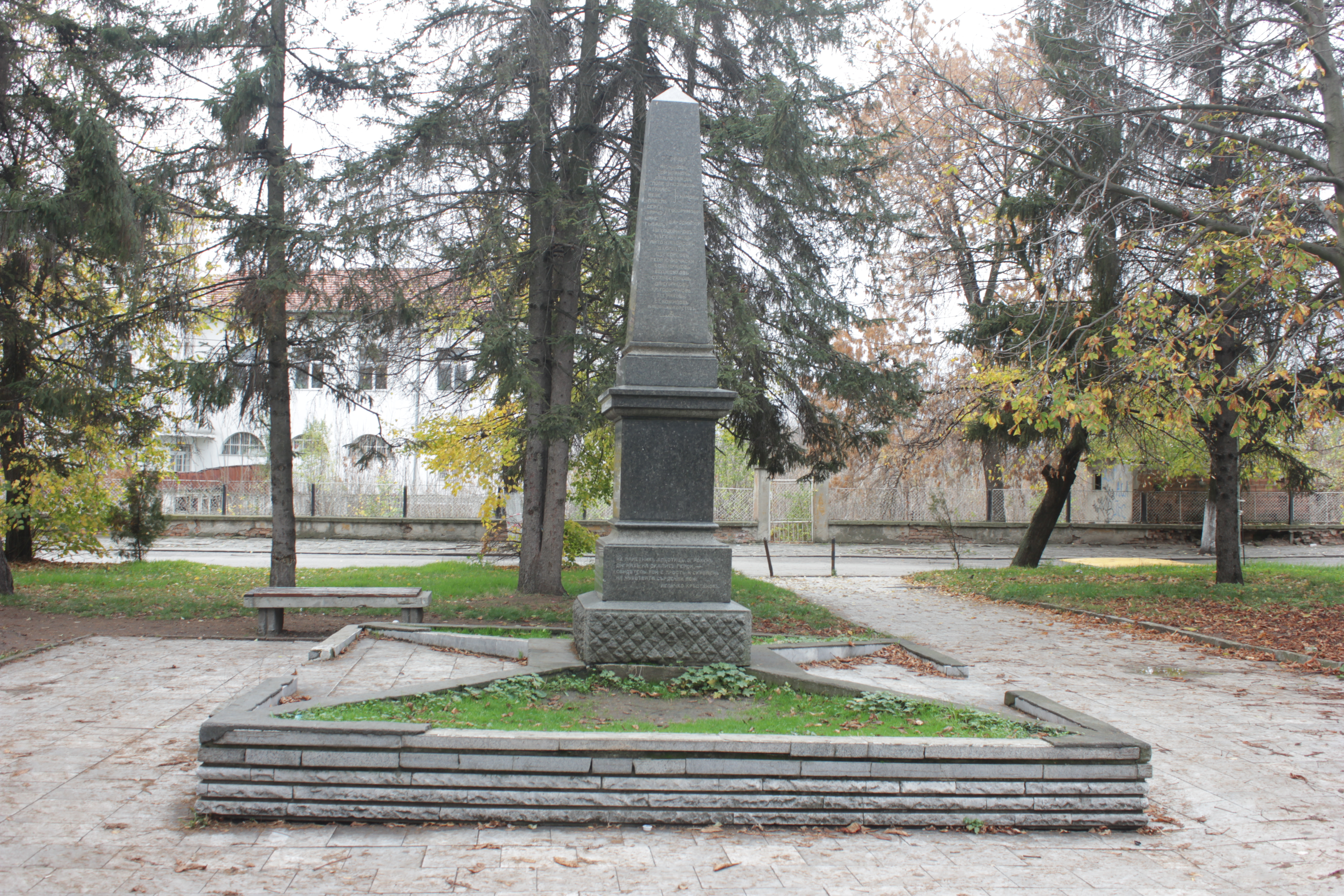
The war memorial in Mramor

The village is situated at an altitude of 526 m in the central part of the Sofia Valley, lying on the south bank of the river Blato, a left tributary of the Iskar. A micro dam called Tsarna Bara has been constructed southwest of the village. There is a mineral spring with a temperature of 40 °С. It falls within the transitional continental climatic zone. The soils are chernozem and smolnitsi.

Administratively, Mramor is part of the Vrabnitsa district of Stolichna Municipality in the northwestern part of the Sofia City Province. It has a territory of 14.362 km^{2}. The closest settlements are the villages of Voluyak to the southwest and Mirovyane to the northeast, as well as the outskirts of the city of Sofia to the south and southeast.

== Transport ==
Mramor is located just outside the Sofia Ring Road, north of a major the junction between the ring road and the Europe motorway (A6), as well as another smaller junction between the A6 and the road connecting the village to Sofia, named Mramor after the settlement. The village is served by three bus lines of the Sofia Public Transport, which connect it to the Sofia Metro.

== Culture ==
The first school in the village was established in 1890. The Church of All Saint was constructed in 1885 and was decorated by Bulgarian woodcarvers from the village of Tresonče near Debar. The local cultural center, known in Bulgarian as a chitalishte, was founded in 1922 and is named after the medieval Bulgarian saint John of Rila. There is a war memorial to the fallen during the First Balkan War, the Second Balkan War and the First World War.
