= Blato (river) =

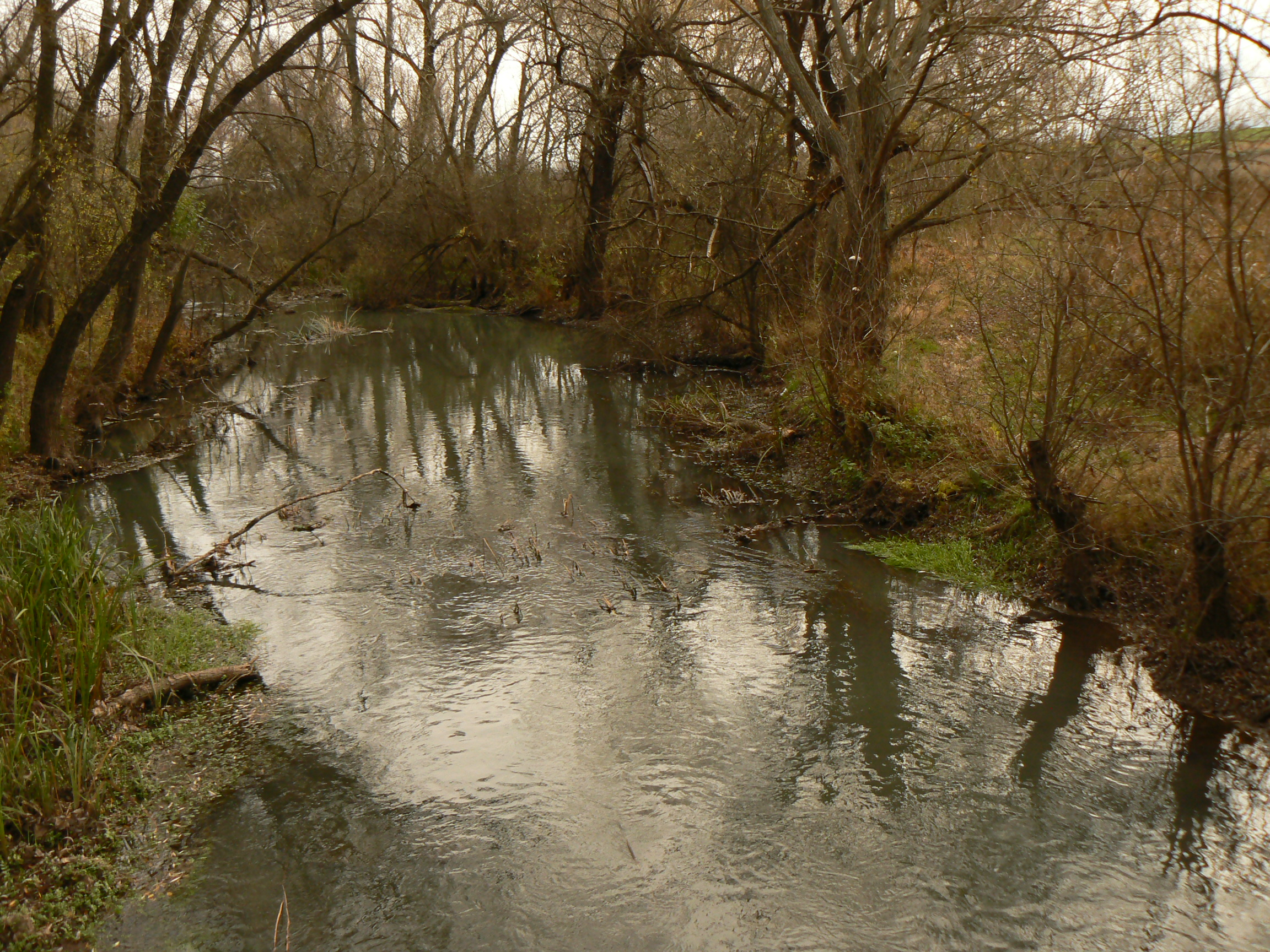

Location
- Country: Bulgaria

Physical characteristics
- Source
  - location: Sofia Valley
  - coordinates: 42°52′41.16″N 23°4′17.04″E
  - elevation: 554 m (1,818 ft)
- Mouth
  - location: Iskar
  - coordinates: 42°48′2.16″N 23°21′48.96″E
  - elevation: 509 m (1,670 ft)
- Length: 30 km (19 mi)
- Basin size: 774 km^{2} (299 sq mi)

Basin features
- Progression: Iskar→ Danube→ Black Sea

The Blato (Bulgarian: Блато) is a 30 km-long river in western Bulgaria, a left tributary of the river Iskar.

The river takes its source from a karst spring at an altitude of 554 m, situated some 1.2 km west of the villages of Opitsvet and Bezden. It flows through the Sofia Valley, initially in direction southeast, and downstream of the village of Mramor it turns east. The river flows into the Iskar at an altitude of 509 m about 1.1 km east of the Kumaritsa neighbourhood of the town of Novi Iskar.

Its drainage basin covers a territory of 774 km^{2} or 9.0% of Iskar's total and drains the whole western portion of the Sofia Valley. The Blato has high water in March–June and low water in July–October. The average annual discharge at the village of Petarch is 0.98 m^{3}/s.

The river flows in Sofia and Sofia City Provinces. There are three towns/cities and four villages along its course. In Sofia Province are located the villages of Opitsvet and Petarch, and the town of Kostinbrod, all of them in Kostinbrod Municipality. In Sofia City Province are the village of Mramor in Vrabnitsa District, the village of Mirovyane in Novi Iskar District, Trebich neighbourhood in Nadezhda District of the capital Sofia, and the town of Novi Iskar. Its waters are utilised for irrigation.
