= Drenovo, Sofia Province =

Coordinates: 42°57′N 23°10′E

Drenovo (Bulgarian: Дреново) is a village (село) in southwestern Bulgaria, located in the Kostinbrod Municipality of the Sofia Province.
