= Bulgarian Rugby Federation =

Governing body

Българска Федерация по Ръгби
- Sport: Rugby union
- Founded: 1962; 63 years ago
- World Rugby affiliation: 1992
- Rugby Europe affiliation: 1967
- President: Atanas Zafirov
- Men's coach: Georgi Petkov

The Bulgarian Rugby Federation (Bulgarian: Българска Федерация по Ръгби) is the governing body for rugby in Bulgaria. It oversees the various national teams and domestic competitions.

== Leadership ==
| Position | Name |
|---|---|
| President | Atanas Zafirov |
| Board Member | Georgi Marinkin |
| Board Member | Georgi Petkov |
| Board Member | Nikolai Kolev |
| Board Member | Georgi Mladenov |
| Board Member | Vladimir Avrionov |
| Board Member | Lyuben Yalmov |
| Board Member | Lyudmil Dimov |
| Board Member | Dimitar Dimitrov |
| Board Member | Pavel Velkov |
| Board Member | Kiril Dobrev |

== See also ==
- Rugby union in Bulgaria
- Bulgaria national rugby union team
