= Mirovyane =

- Village
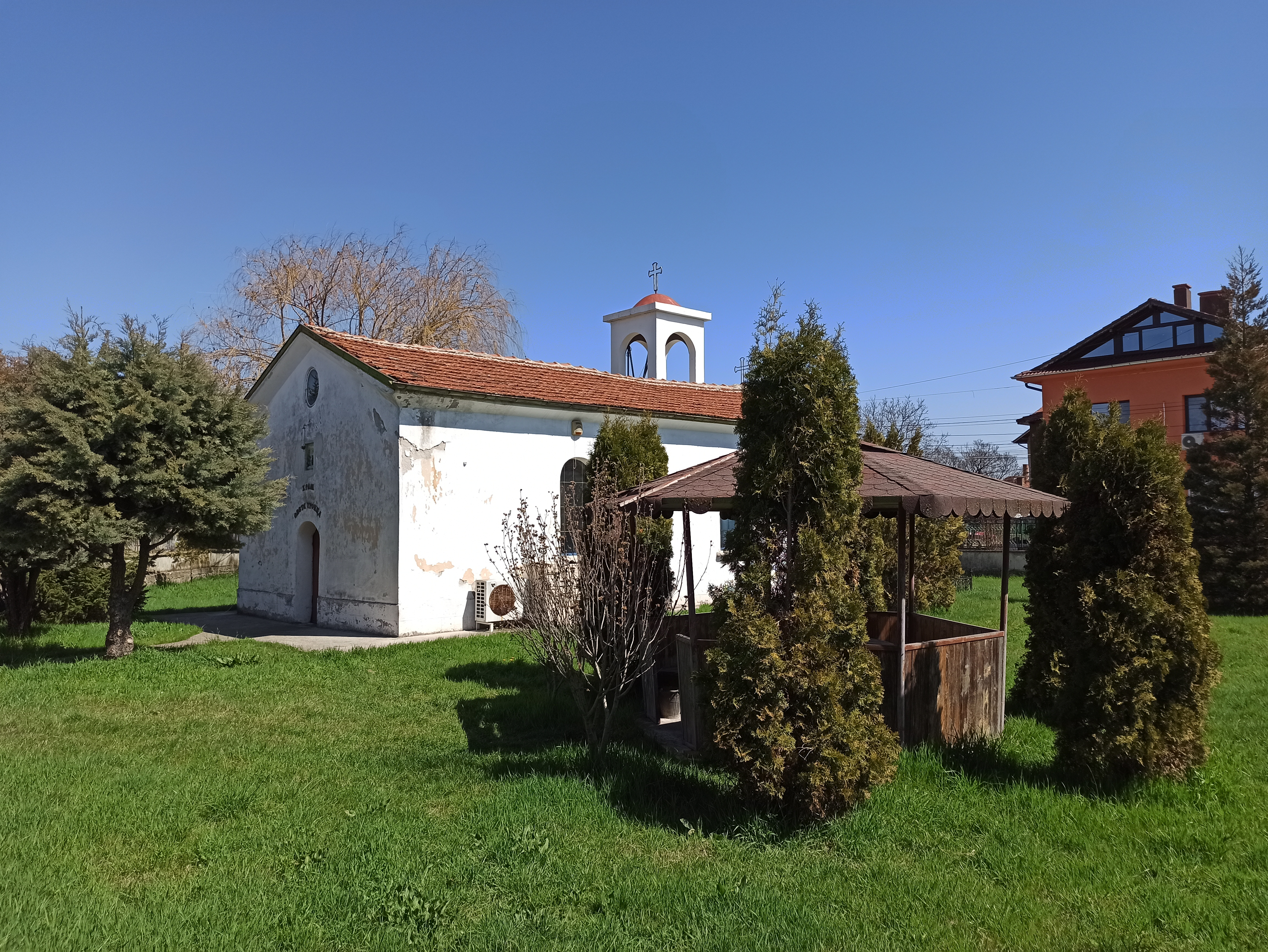

- Location within Bulgaria
- Coordinates: 42°47′0″N 23°18′0″E
- Country: Bulgaria
- Province: Sofia City
- Municipality: Stolichna Municipality
- Elevation: 519 m (1,703 ft)

Population (2025)
  - Total: 1,500
- Time zone: UTC+2 (EET)
  - Summer (DST): UTC+3 (EEST)
- Postal code: 1289

Mirovyane (Bulgarian: Мировяне) is a village in Novi Iskar district of the Bulgarian capital Sofia, located some 12 km northwest of the city center. As of 2024 it has 1,430 inhabitants.

== Geography ==
The village is situated at an altitude of 519 m in the central part of the Sofia Valley, lying on the north bank of the river Blato a few kilometers west of its confluence with the Iskar. It falls within the transitional continental climatic zone. The soils are alluvial and cinnamon forest.

Administratively, Mirovyane is part of the Novi Iskar district of Stolichna Municipality in the northwestern part of the Sofia City Province. It has a territory of 10.304 km^{2}. The closest settlements are the village of Mramor to the west, the outskirts of the town of Novi Iskar to east, and the Trebich neighbourhood of the city of Sofia to the south.

Mirovyane is located just outside the Sofia Ring Road very close to the Europe motorway (A6). It is served by two bus lines of the Sofia Public Transport.

== History and culture ==
The village was mentioned in Ottoman documents from 1576 and 1728. In 1870 the Bulgarian revolutionary Vasil Levski established a revolutionary committee in Mirovyane.

The Church of the Holy Trinity was constructed in 1871 and was decorated by Bulgarian woodcarvers from the village of Tresonče near Debar. The local cultural center, known in Bulgarian as a chitalishte, was founded in 1919 and is named after the Bulgarian revolutionary Hristo Botev. There is a war memorial to the fallen during the First Balkan War, the Second Balkan War and the First World War.

== People ==
- Dimitar Penev, football player and coach
