= Dramsha =

Dramsha Дръмша
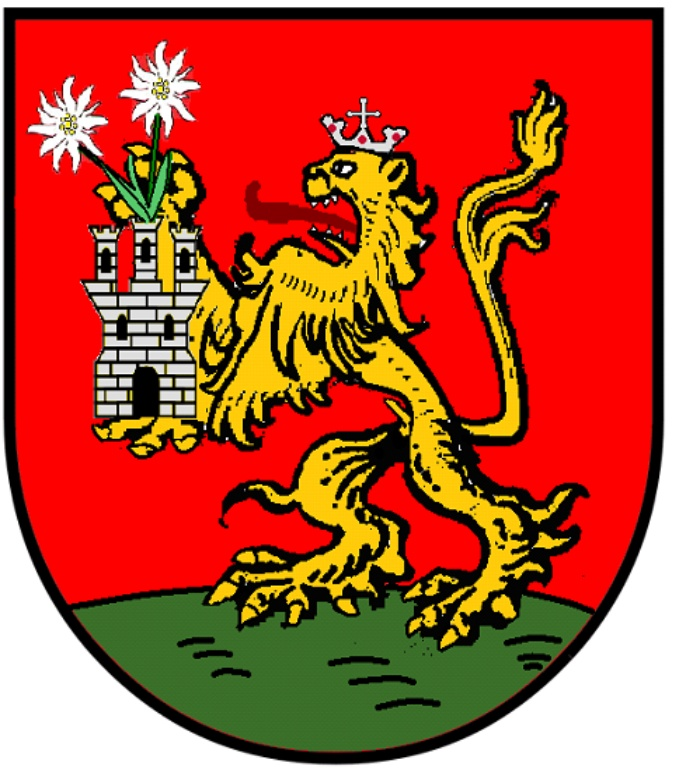
- Seal

- Location of Dramsha
- Coordinates: 42°56′N 23°12′E
- Country: Bulgaria
- Provinces (Oblast): Sofia

Government
  - Mayor: Krasimir Kunchev
- Elevation: 844 m (2,769 ft)

Population (2020)
  - Total: 311
- Time zone: UTC+2 (EET)
  - Summer (DST): UTC+3 (EEST)
- Postal Code: 2238
- Area code: 07119
- Vehicle registration: CO

Dramsha or Drumsha (Bulgarian: Дръмша) is a village in Kostinbrod Municipality, Sofia Province Bulgaria. The legend goes that during Ottoman times, the invading Turks couldn't reach the village due to bad weather and non-existent roads. Therefore, they called it Drumsha which means "Bad road" in rough translation. Until the late 90s it was lively place often visited by many people coming from Sofia for the summer due to the village's proximity to the capital. However, more recently the population has decreased significantly and Drumsha is somehow less preferred destination. As a result, some establishments like restaurant and department store were closed and nowadays most people depend on either home-produced basic goods or import them from Sofia or nearby town of Kostinbrod. Nature is well preserved in and around Drumsha, mainly due to the lesser impact of humans. However, the village - and the region as a whole - suffer from a lack of water. Soil is generally very dry and not fertile. Livestock is common among local population and it is usual for almost every household to have goats, cows, horses, pigs, etc.

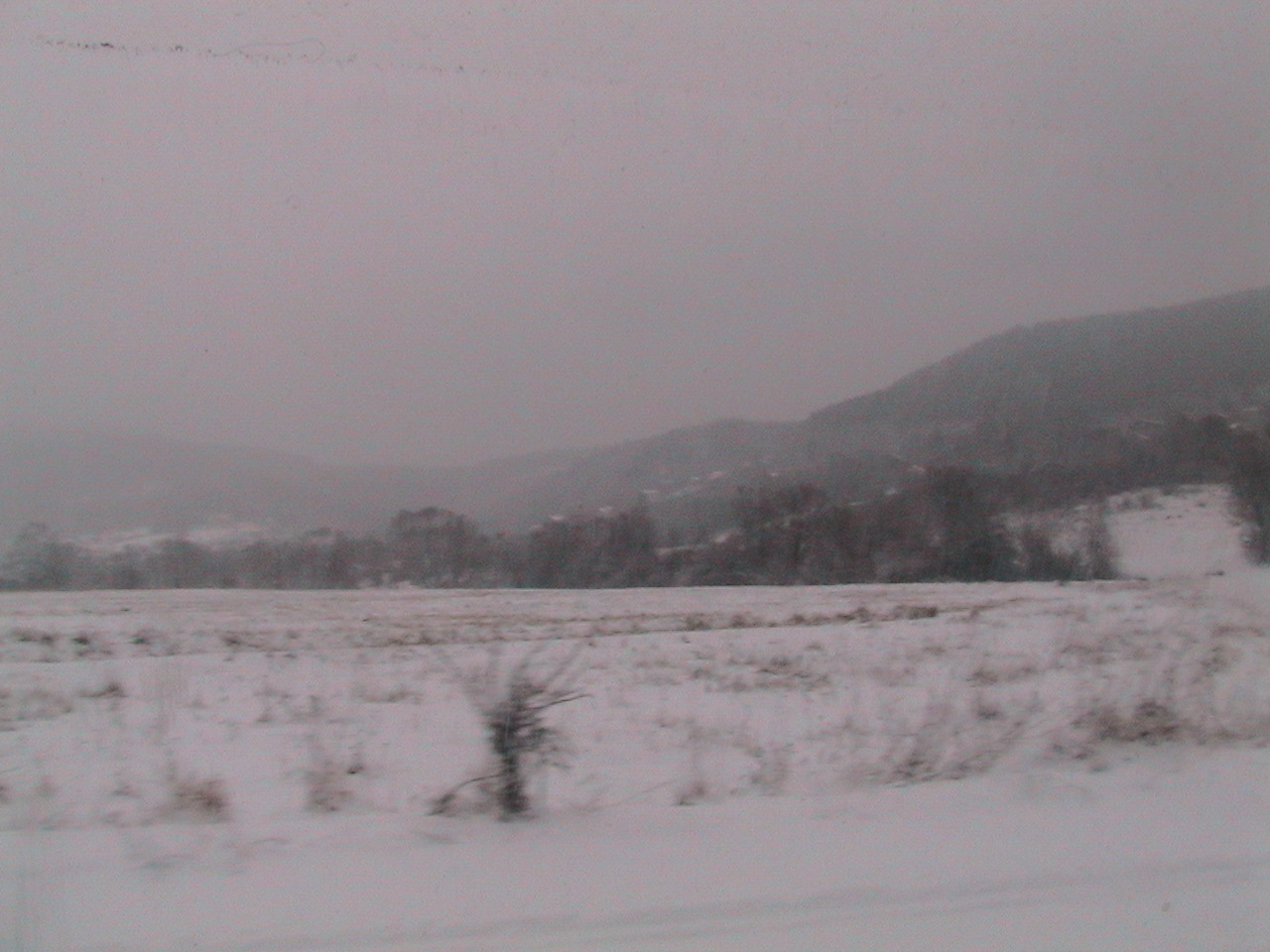
Winter in Dramscha

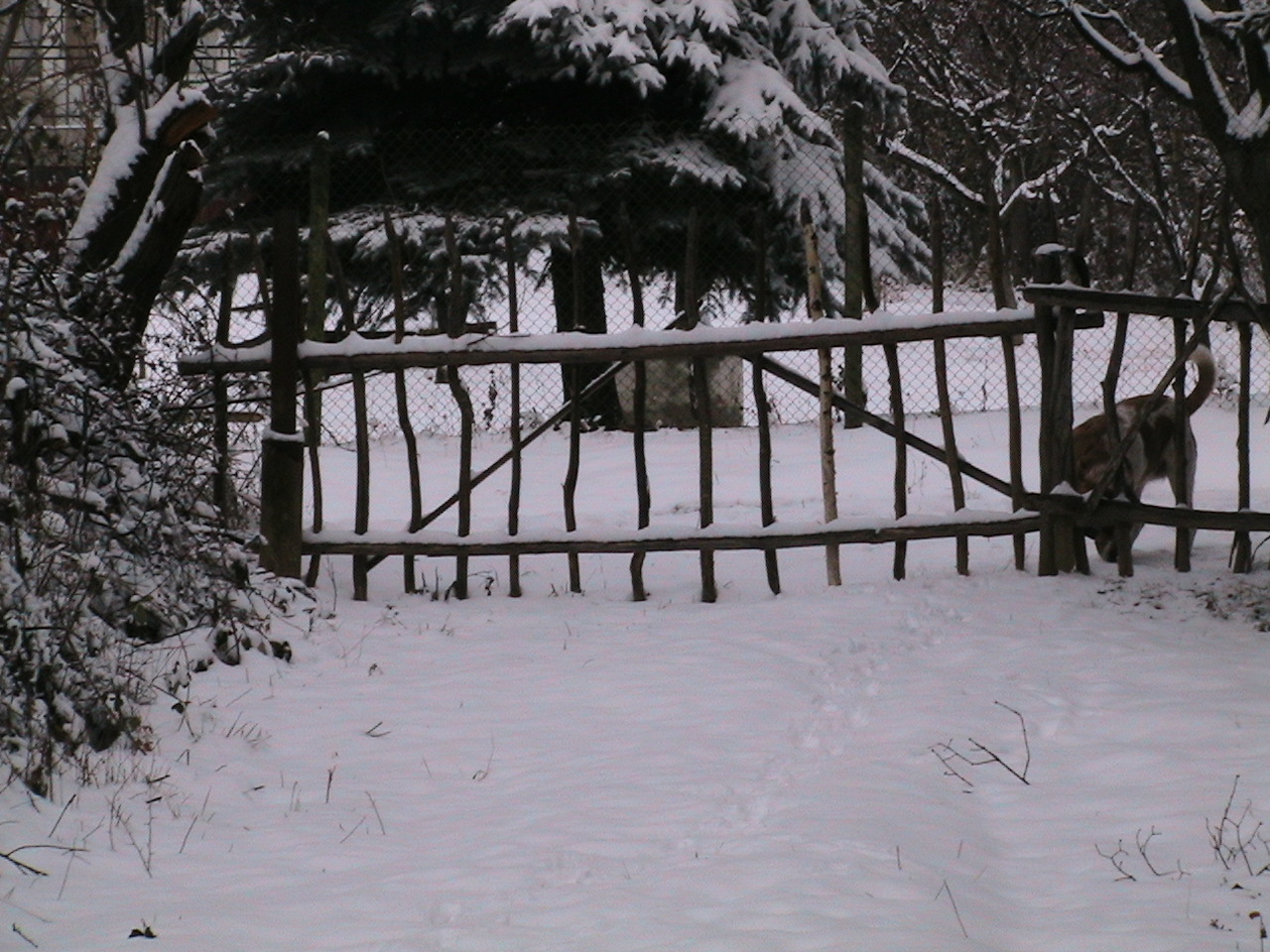
The Swedish gate

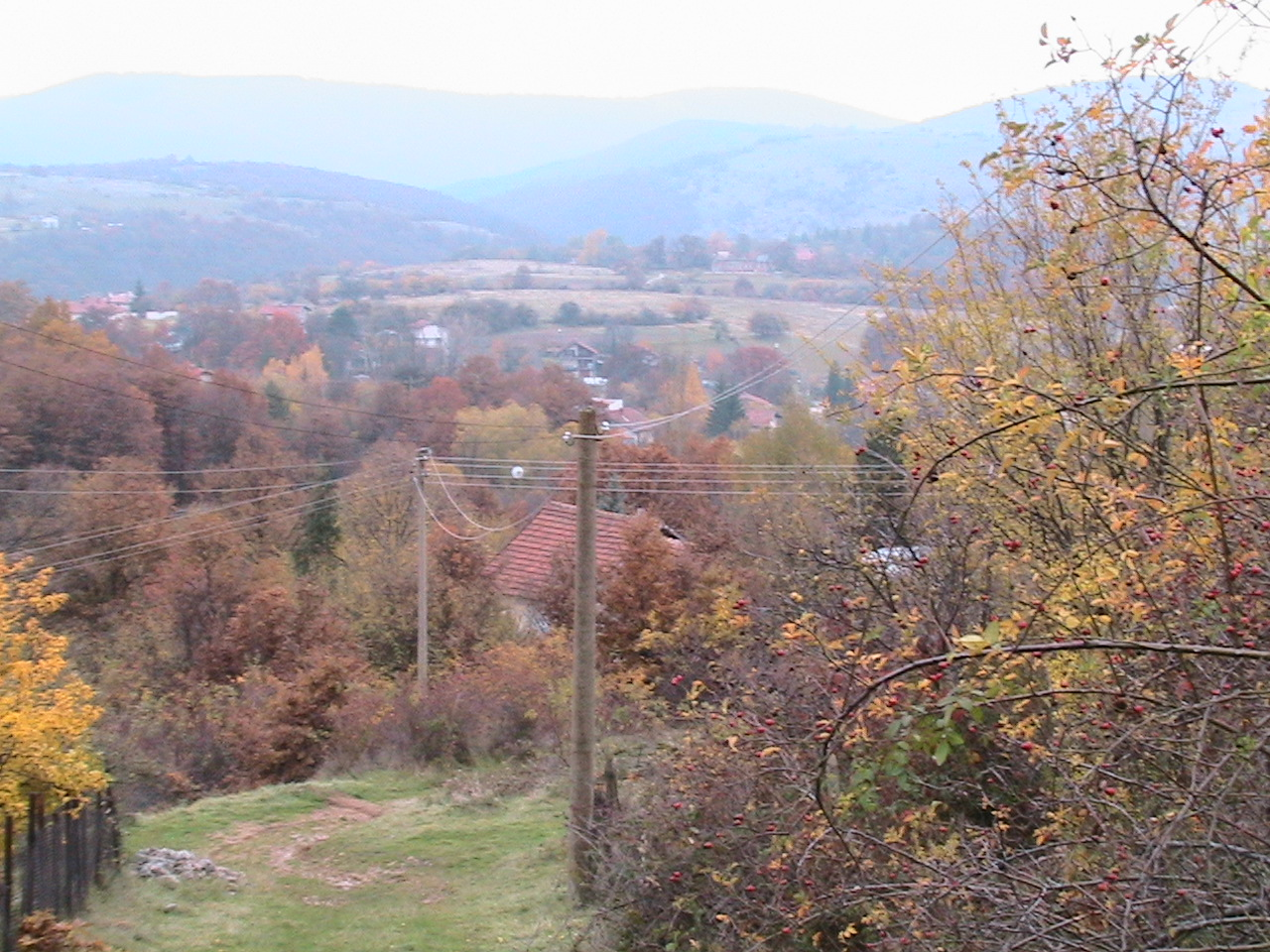
The new village
