= Kostinbrod Municipality =

Coordinates: 42°49′01″N 23°13′01″E

Kostinbrod Municipality Община Костинброд
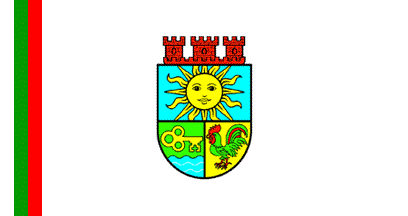
- Flag

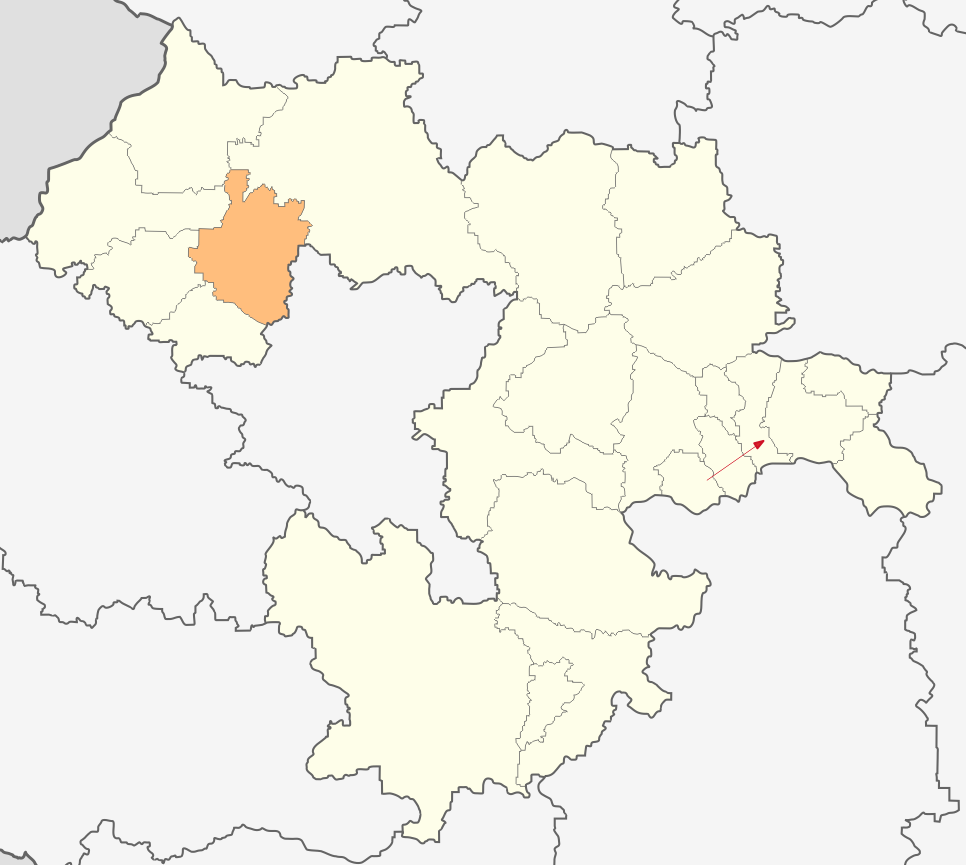
- Country: Bulgaria
- Province: Sofia Province
- Seat: Kostinbrod

Area
  - Total: 254.4 km^{2} (98.2 sq mi)

Population (2024)
  - Total: 17,430
  - Density: 68.51/km^{2} (177.5/sq mi)
- Website: kostinbrod.bg

Kostinbrod Municipality (Bulgarian: Община Костинброд) is a municipality in Sofia Province, western Bulgaria. Covering a territory of 254.4 km^{2}, it is the twelfth largest of the 22 municipalities in the province, encompassing 3.59% of its total area. It borders the municipalities of Bozhurishte to the southwest, Slivnitsa to the west, Dragoman and Godech to the northwest, Svoge to the east, and Stolichna to the southeast, the latter belonging to the Sofia City Province.

== Geography ==
The terrain of the municipality is flat, hilly and mountainous. Its southern reaches fall within the northwestern part of the Sofia Valley, where the municipality’s lowest altitude is situated — 526 m. To north are several ridges of the Balkan Mountains — Chepan, Mala Planina, where there highest point of the municipality is located at an altitude of 1,155 m, and Sofiyska Planina.

Kosntinbrod Municipality falls within the temperate continental climatic zone with an average temperature of 9.9 °C at the town of Kostinbrod. Most of its territory is drained by the river Blato, a left tributary of the Iskar of the Danube drainage. The mean annual precipitation is about 600 mm.

== Transport ==
Kosntinbrod Municipality is traversed by six roads of the national network with a total length of 64.1 km, including a 35.8 km section of the second class II-81 road Sofia–Montana–Lom, the last 2.3 km of the third class III-164 road, as well as the first 10 km of the third class III-811 road, the first 0.6 km of the third class III-813 road, the first 12.3 km of the third class III-8102 road, and the first 3.1 km of the third class III-8103 road.

In its southern reaches runs a 10.7 km section of railway line No. 1 Kalotina–Sofia–Plovdiv–Kapitan Andreevo.

== Demography ==
The population is 17,430 as of 2024.

There are 13 villages and one town in Kosntinbrod Municipality:

- Bezden
- Bogyovtsi
- Buchin Prohod
- Chibaovtsi
- Dragovishtitsa
- Drenovo
- Dramsha
- Golyanovtsi
- Gradets
- Kostinbrod
- Opitsvet
- Petarch
- Ponor
- Tsarichina

== Gallery ==
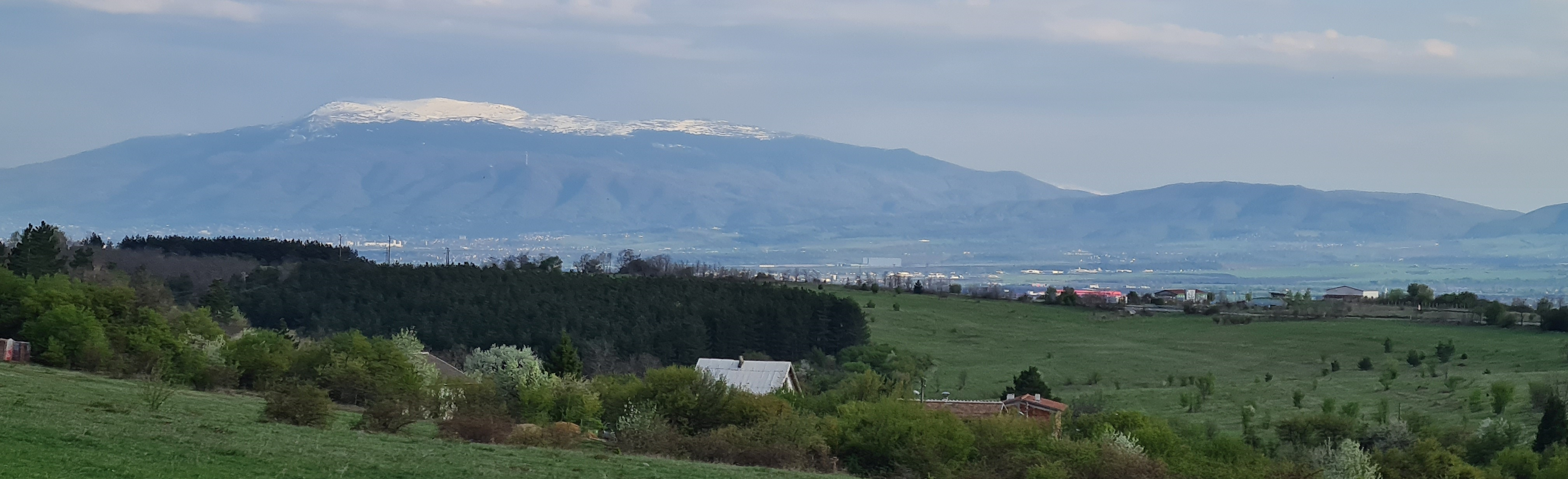
Vitosha seen from Beledie Han

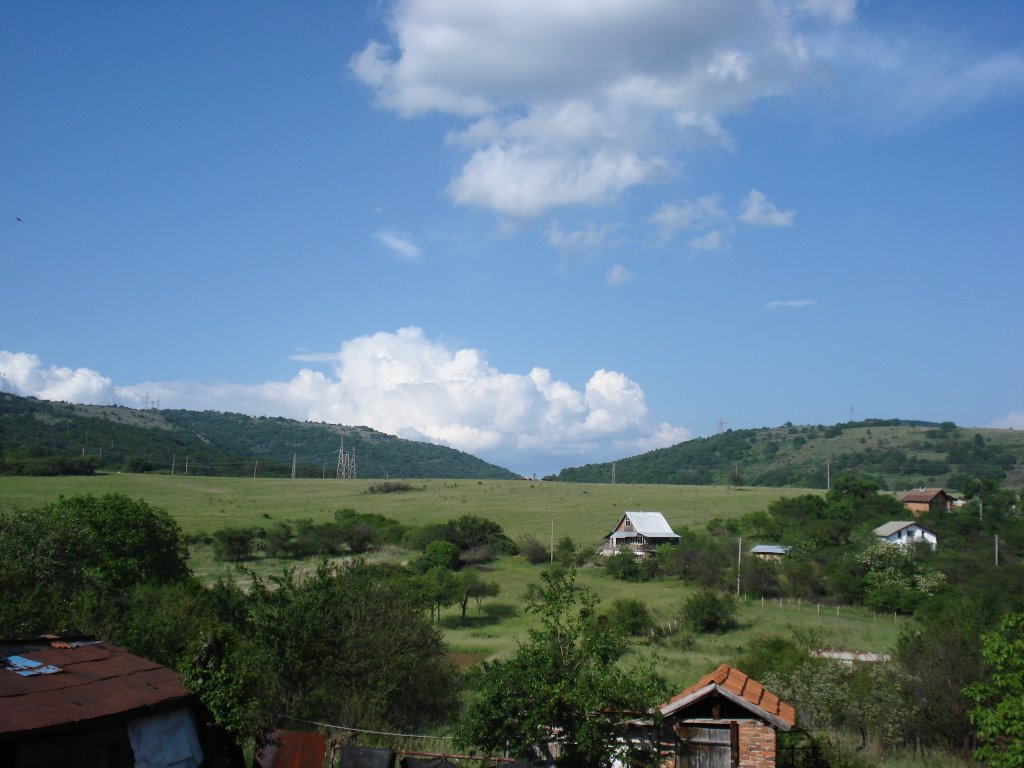
A view to Beledie Han

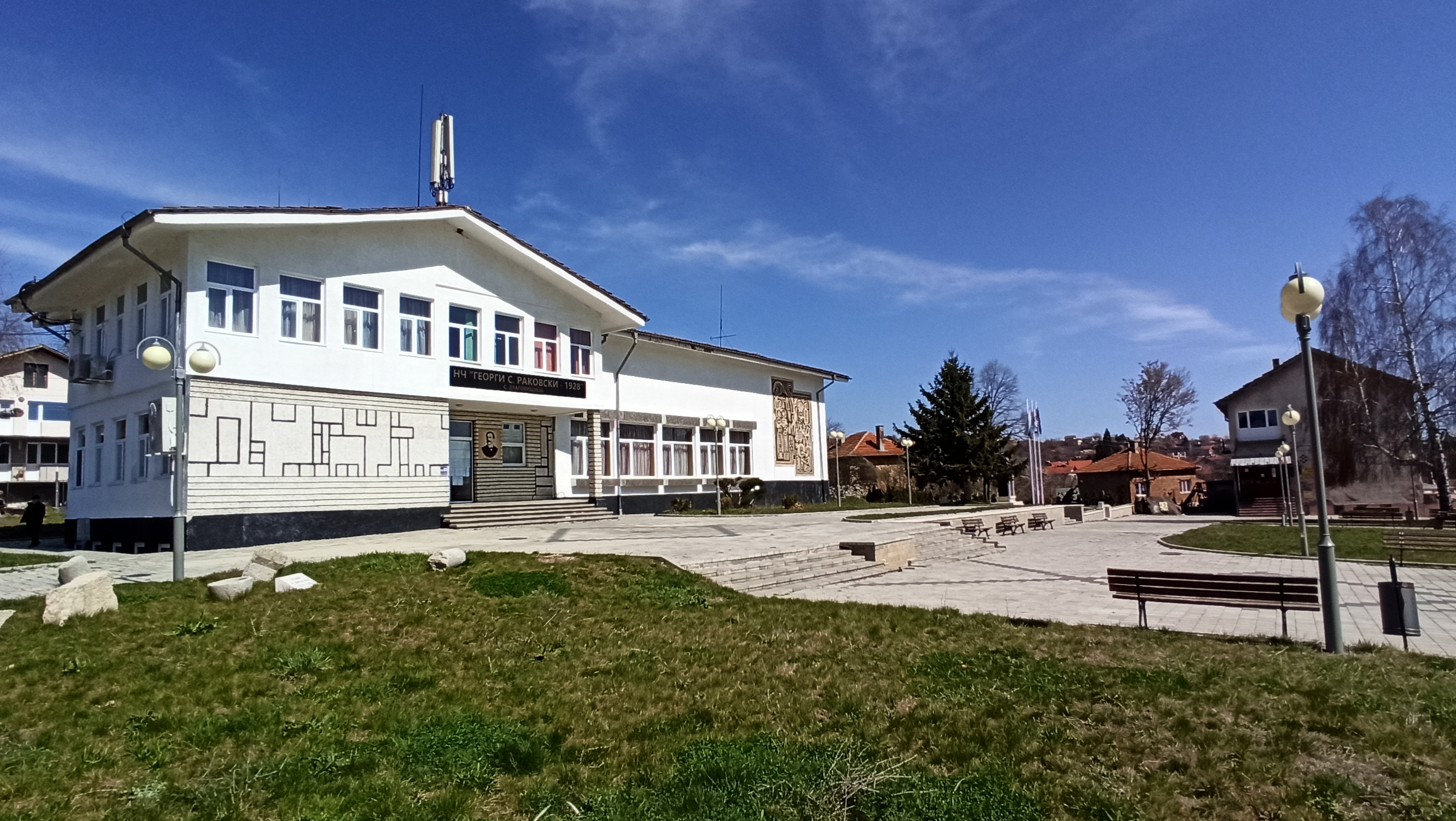
Dragovishtitsa

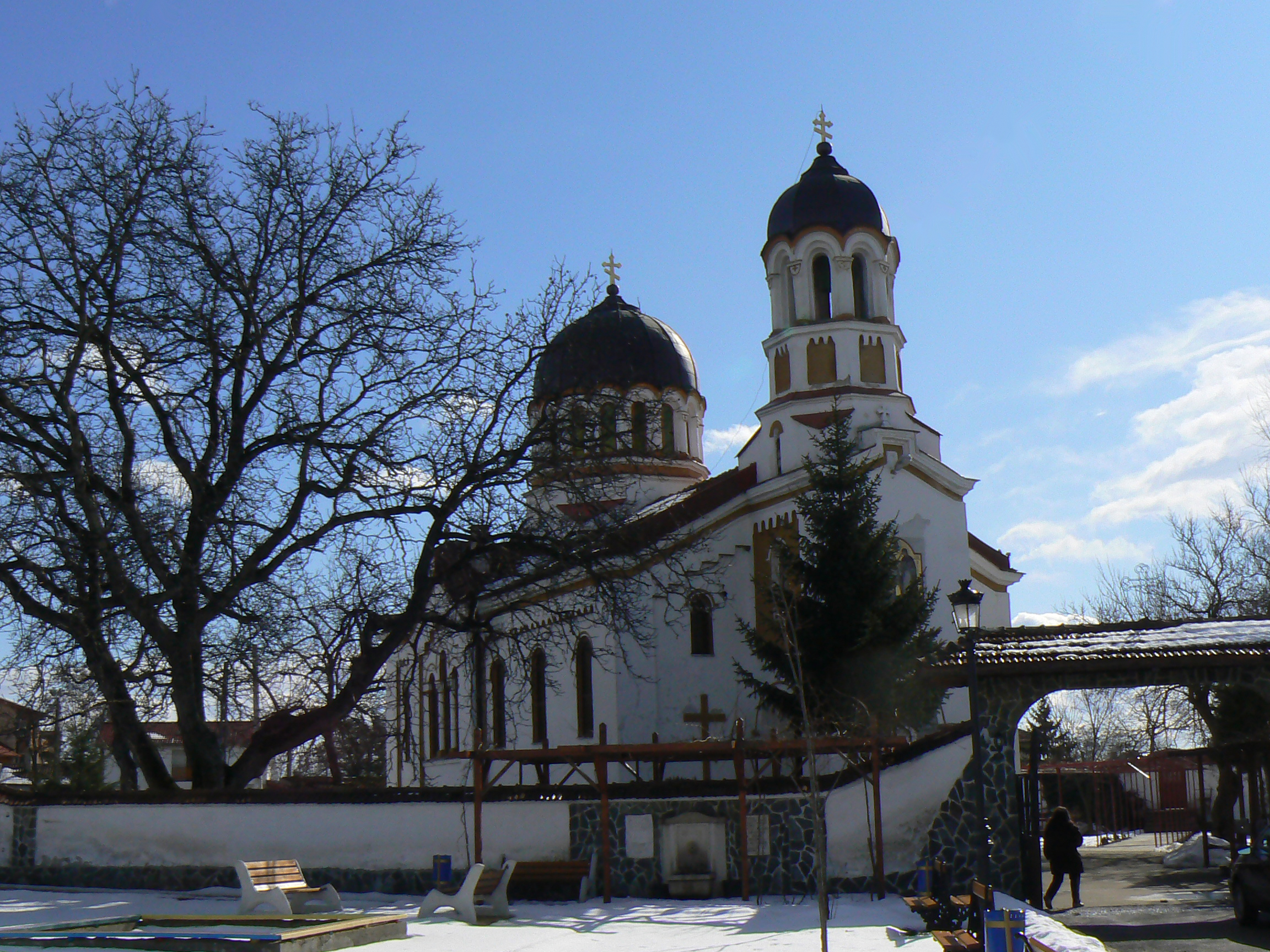
The Church of Saints Cyril and Methodius, Kostinbrod
