= Petarch =

Bulgarian village

Coordinates: 42°50′00″N 23°08′00″E

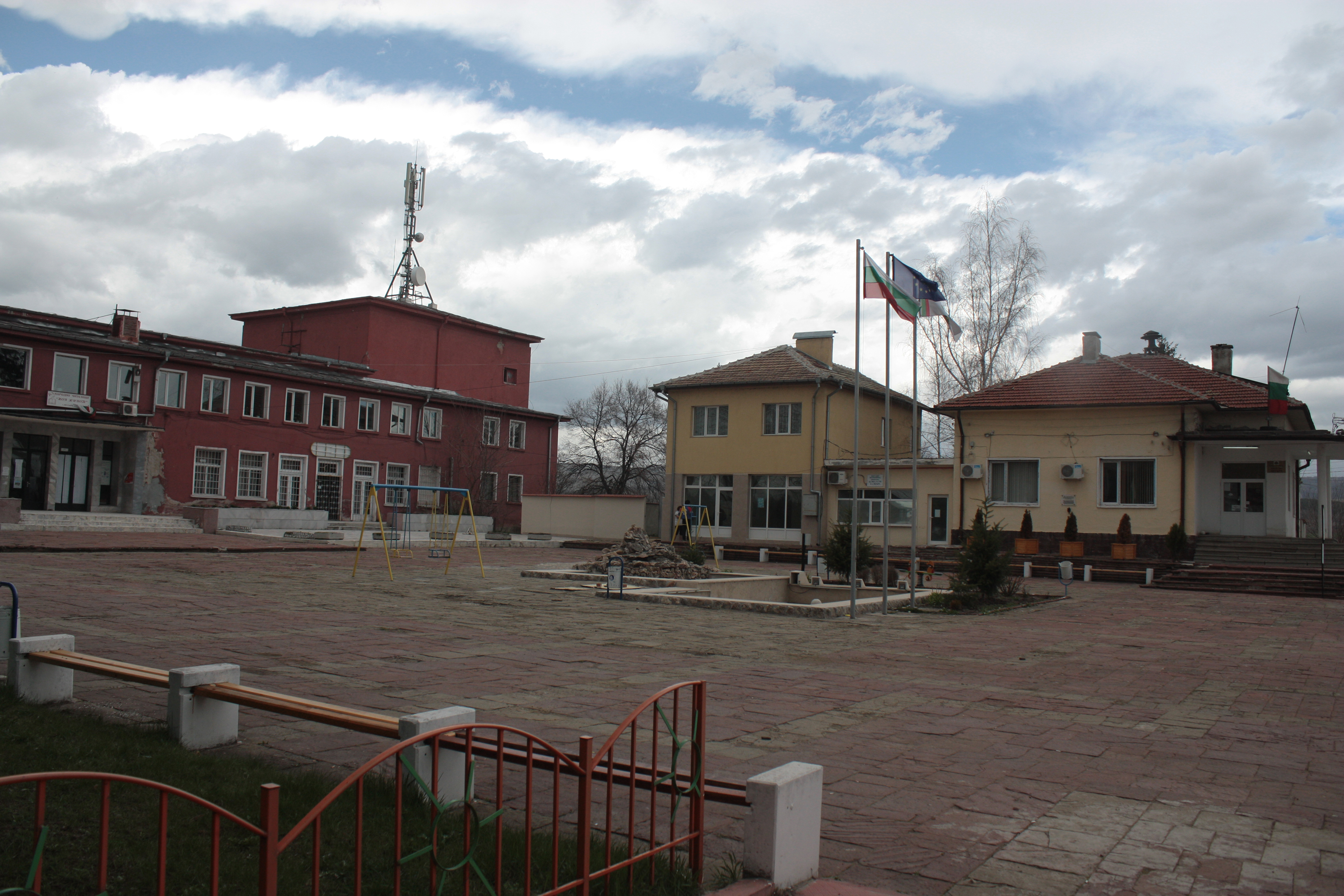
Petarch central square. Right - municipal office, left - Culture club "New Life"

Petarch (Bulgarian: Петърч [pɛˈtɤrt͡ʃ]) is a village in Kostinbrod Municipality, Sofia Province, located in western Bulgaria approximately 5 km south-west of the town of Kostinbrod. In the centre there is a monument, several pubs and a computer club. There exists an Orthodox church and a school. There are several buses to Kostinbrod, Slivnitsa and Sofia.

Petarch was first mentioned as Bedriç in an Ottoman record of 1448, later as Bedric in 1520, Petreiç in 1574, Petriç in 1728, Petriçe in 1519, 1574 and 1649. In the 17th-century Boyana Screed, it was listed as ПЄТРЪЧЪ. The official name was Petrich until 1934, when it was renamed to the current form. The toponym is derived from the personal name Peter (Bulgarian Petar, Петър).
