= RC Yantra Gabrovo =

Bulgarian rugby union club, based in Gabrovo

- Full name: Rugby Club Yantra Gabrovo
- Nickname: Yantrarugby
- Founded: 1973; 53 years ago
- Location: Gabrovo, Bulgaria
- Ground: Stadium Hristo Smirnenski
- Chairman: Todor Denchev
- Coach: Venelin Ivanov
- Captain: Dimitar Georgiev
- League: Rugby 15's/ Rugby 7's /Beach rugby
Team kit

RC Yantra Gabrovo is a Bulgarian rugby union club located in Gabrovo, Bulgaria.

Currently the club is playing in the Bulgarian rugby championship.

== History ==
Yantra RC is a rugby union club in Gabrovo, Bulgaria which was founded in 1973 by Dimitar Kontohov and developed by coach Georgi Petkov through the years. The team participates in all rugby groups including kids, juniors and men which are playing Rugby 15's, Rugby 7's and Beach Rugby.

The pitch: "Hristo Smirnenski" Stadium is located in Gabrovo, Bulgaria. The dimensions of the field are in regulation with the requirements and the games can be watched from around 200 seats. The building has 4 changing rooms with separated bathrooms and sauna as well.

Yantra RC museum is an attraction for the visitors which shows all the history in the past years and can be seen opened during home games.

== Honors ==
- Bulgarian Cup: 6 times
- Bulgarian Sevens: 3 times
- International Krasiko Beach Rugby: 4 times Gold medals and 2 times Silver medals
