= Bozhurishte =

Bozhurishte Божурище
- Location of Bozhurishte
- Coordinates: 42°45′45″N 23°11′59″E
- Country: Bulgaria
- Province (Oblast): Sofia Province

Government
  - Mayor: Georgi Dimov
- Elevation: 573 m (1,880 ft)

Population (2024)
  - Total: 5,709
- Time zone: UTC+2 (EET)
  - Summer (DST): UTC+3 (EEST)
- Postal Code: 2227
- Area code: 07112

Bozhurishte (Bulgarian: Божурище [boˈʒuriʃtɛ]) is a town in western Bulgaria. It is the administrative center of Bozhurishte Municipality in Sofia Province; close to Kostinbrod and the capital Sofia. The old airport of Sofia, now a military one, is near the town. Bozhurishte was first mentioned in 1750. It is situated in the Sofia Valley.

== Etymology ==
Its name is derived from the flower peony (Bulgarian: божур, romanized: bojur).

== Demographics ==
Historical population
Year	Pop.	±%
1992	4,724	—
2001	5,182	+9.7%
2011	5,619	+8.4%
2021	5,826	+3.7%

== Economy ==
The state-owned weapons manufacturer TEREM operates from Bozhurishte. The Sofia–Bozhurishte Industrial Park is among the largest industrial and logistics zones in the region.

== Gallery ==
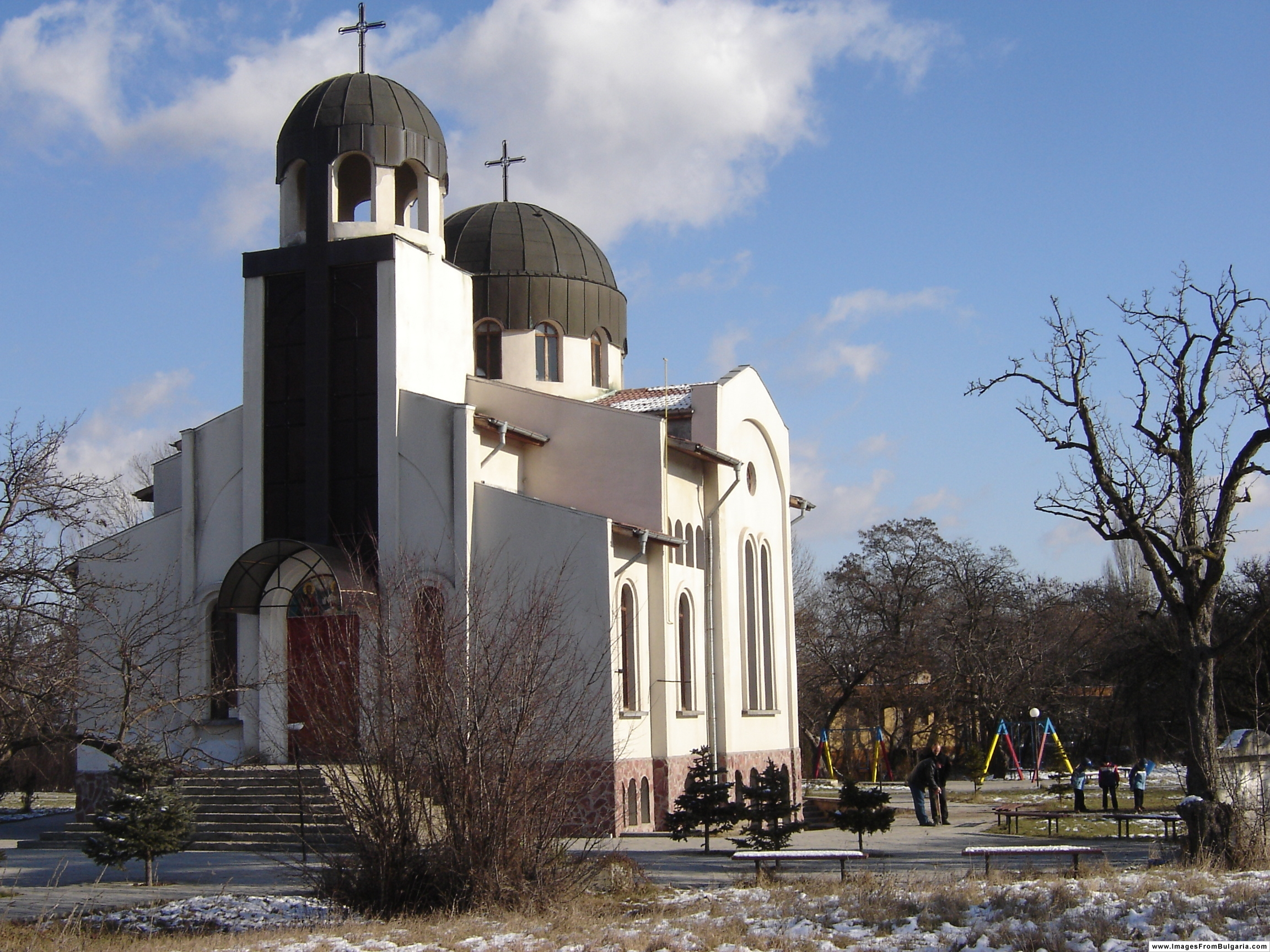
Church

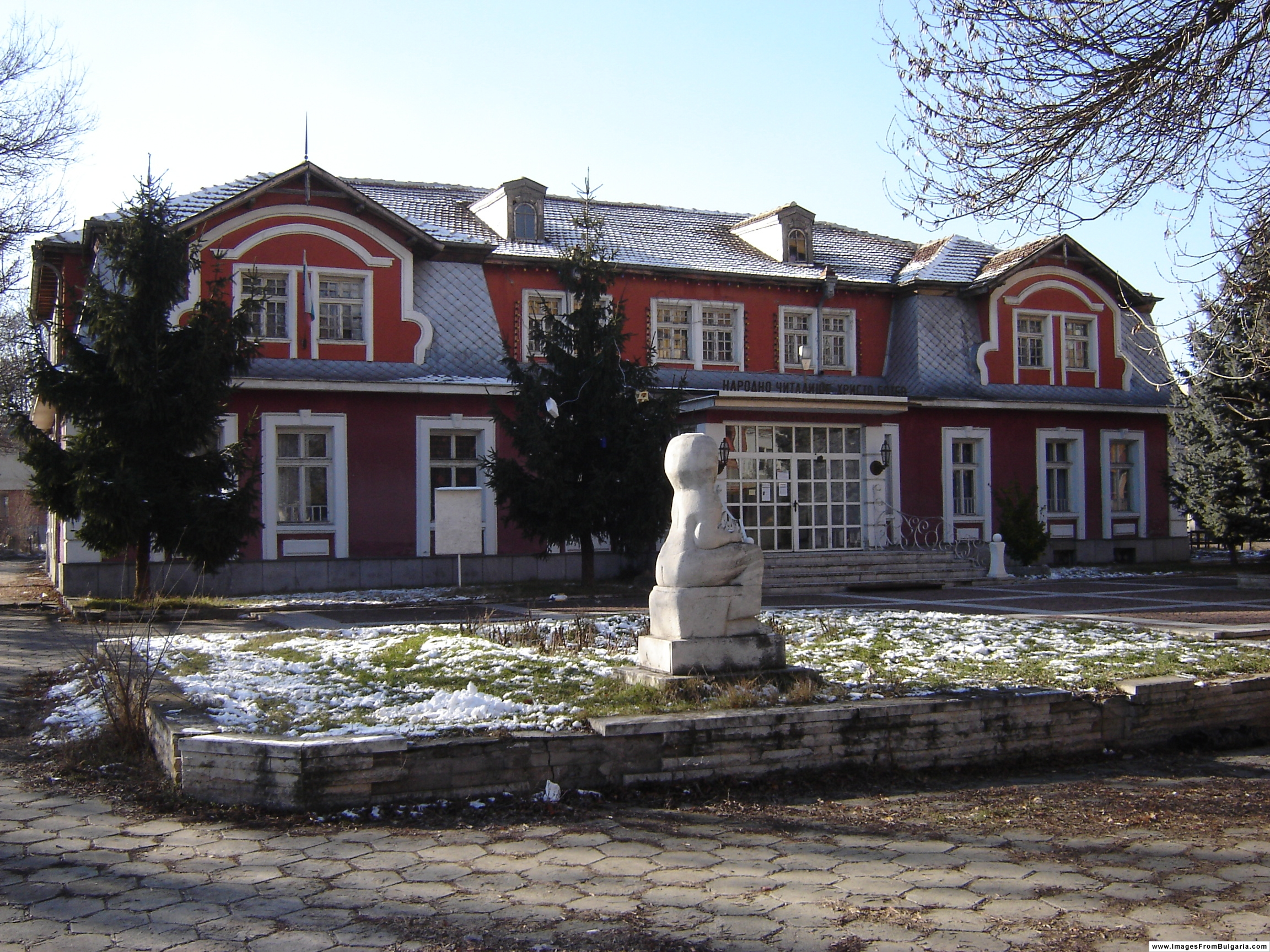
Chitalishte (local cultural centre)

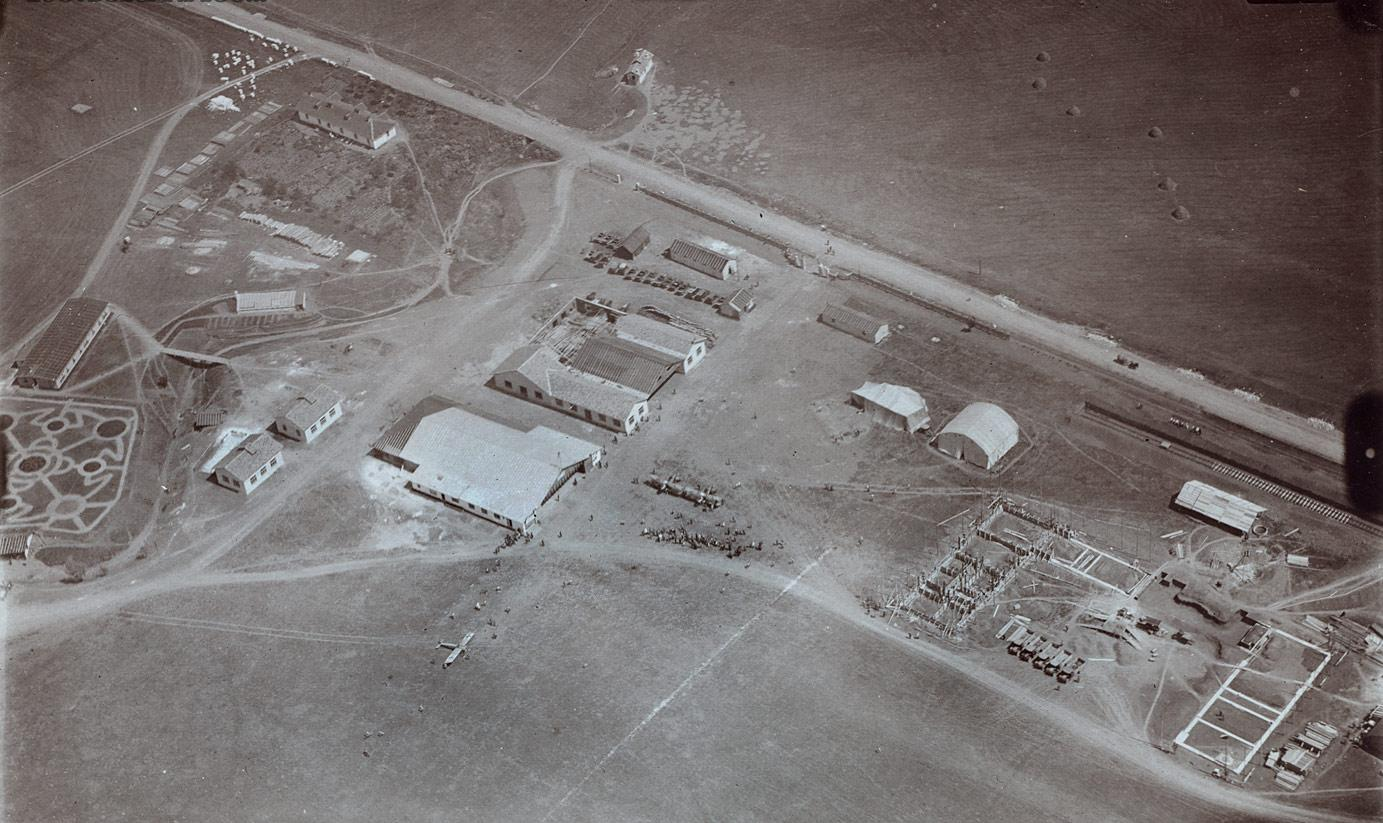
Bozhurishte Airfield 1917
