= RC Varna =

Bulgarian rugby union club, based in Varna

- Full name: Rugby Club Varna
- Founded: 1964; 62 years ago
- Location: Varna, Bulgaria
- Ground: Stadion Mladost
- Chairman: Daniel Papazov
Team kit

RC Varna is a Bulgarian rugby union club in Varna.

== History ==
The club was founded in 1964.
