= Breznik Municipality =

Municipality in Pernik Province

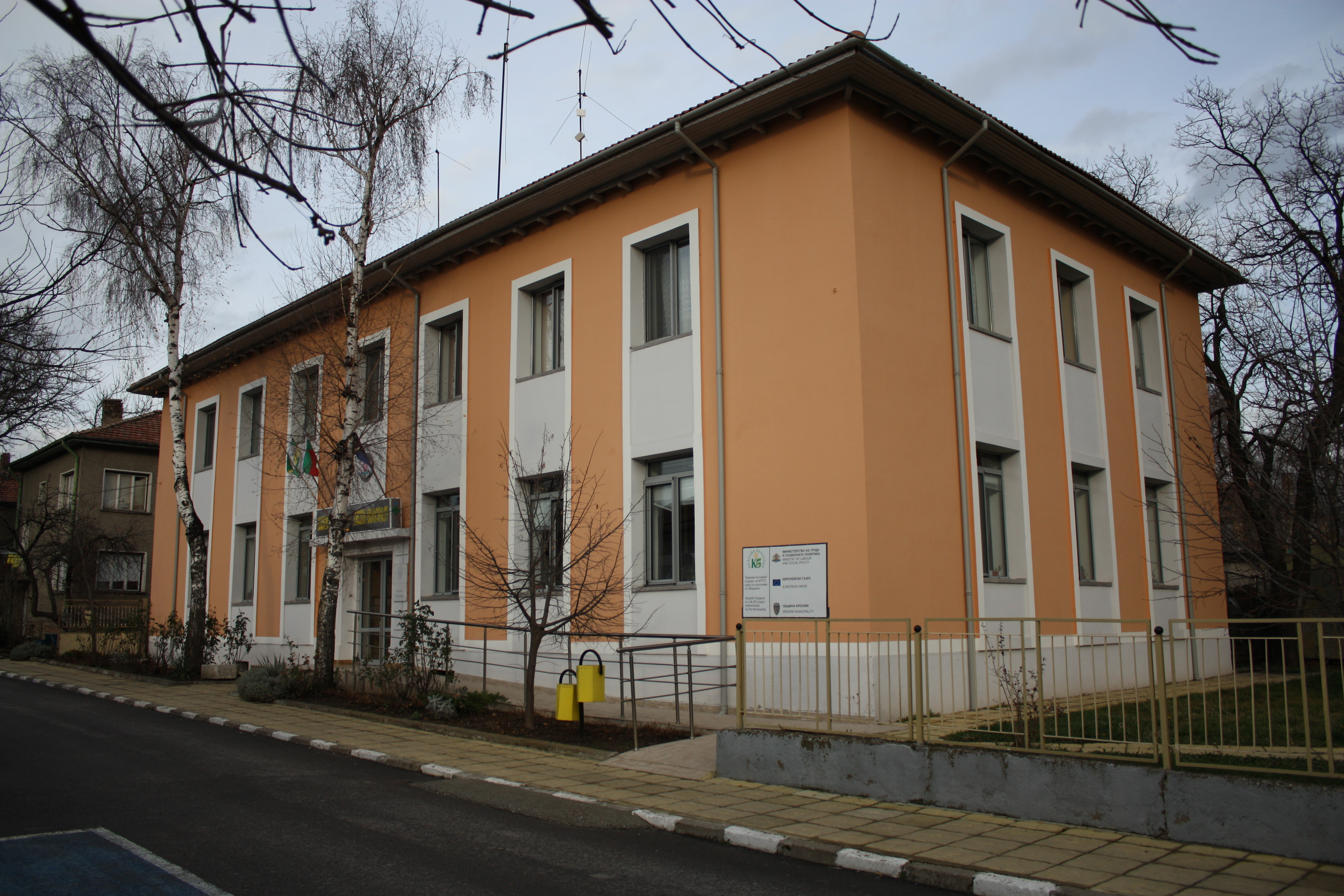
Breznik municipality hall

Breznik Municipality (Bulgarian: Община Брезник) is a municipality in the Pernik Province of Bulgaria.

== Demography ==
Ethnic composition of Breznik Municipality
1. Bulgarians (92.3%)
2. Gypsies/Romani (2.72%)
3. Turks (0.1%)
4. Other (0.16%)

At the 2011 census, the population of Breznik was 6,945. Most of the inhabitants were Bulgarians (92.30%) with a minority of Gypsies/Romani (2.72%), Turks (0.10%) and 6.94% of the population's ethnicity was unknown or unanswered.

== Villages ==
In addition to the capital town of Breznik, there are 34 villages in the municipality. However, 13 of the villages have become part of other settlements in the municipality, meaning that in practice their number is 21.

- Arzan
- Babitsa
- Banishte
- Begunovtsi
- Bilintsi (part of Garlo)
- Breznishki Izvor
- Brusnik (part of Krasava)
- Velkovtsi
- Vidritsa (part of Garlo)
- Gigintsi
- Goz (part of Babitsa)
- Gorna Sekirna
- Gorni Romantsi (part of Krasava)
- Garlo
- Dolna Sekirna
- Dolni Romantsi (part of Arzan)
- Dushintsi (part of Stanyovtsi)
- Zavala (part of Krasava)
- Konska
- Kosharevo
- Krasava
- Krivonos (part of Breznishki Izvor)
- Murtintsi (part of Garlo)
- Nepraznentsi
- Noevtsi
- Ozarnovtsi (part of Krasava)
- Rebro
- Rezhantsi
- Razhavets (part of Banishte)
- Sadovik
- Slakovtsi
- Sopitsa
- Stanyovtsi
- Yaroslavtsi (part of Krasava)
