= Vrabnitsa, Sofia =

District of Sofia, Bulgaria

Coordinates: 42°44′N 23°17′E

Vrabnitsa Връбница
- District of Sofia
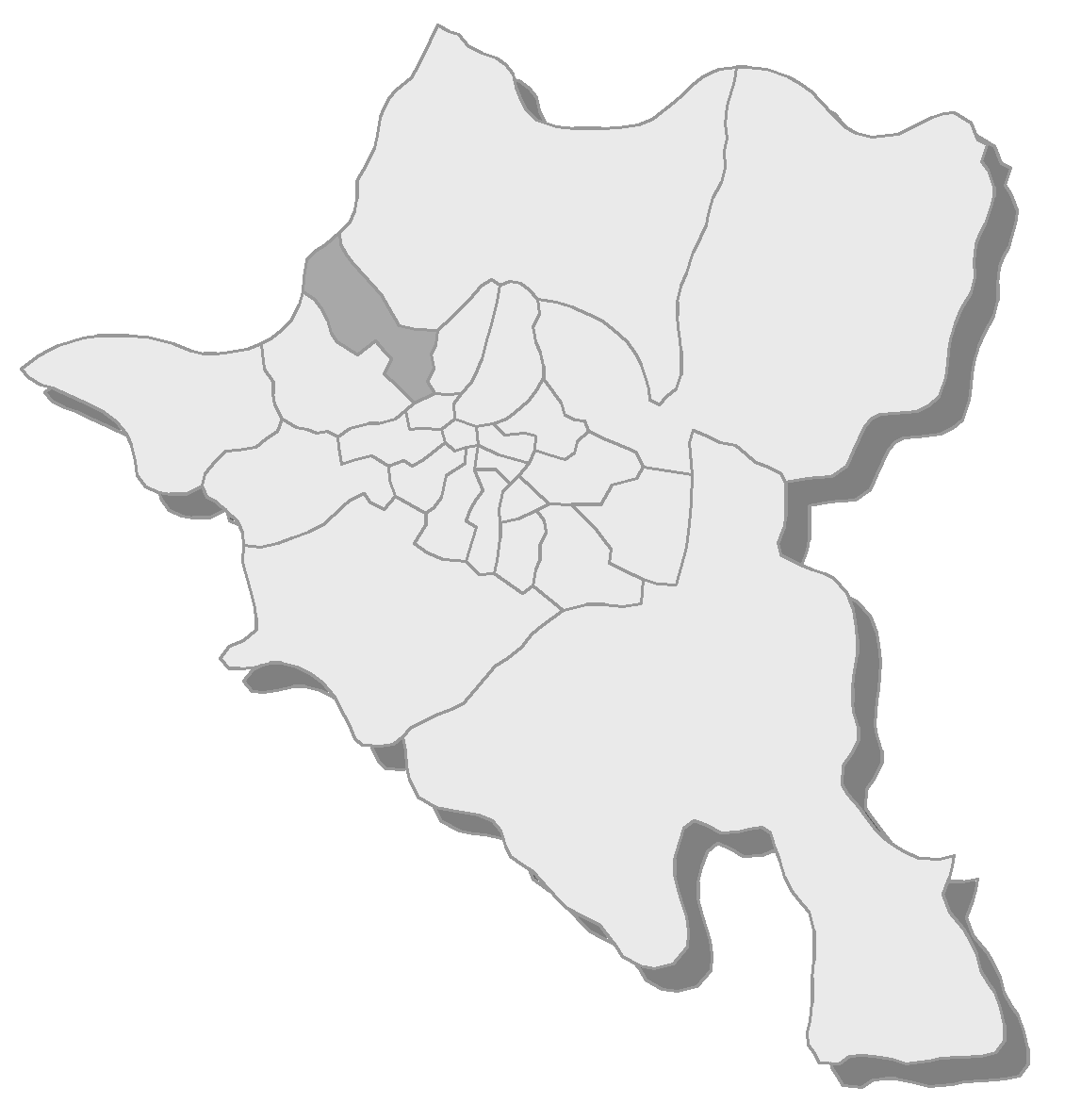
- Location of Vrabnitsa in Sofia Municipality
- Country: Bulgaria
- Province: Sofia City
- Municipality: Stolichna

Vrabnitsa (Bulgarian: Връбница [ˈvrɤbnit͡sɐ]) is a district of Sofia, located in the western part of the Sofia municipality. It has a population of 47,417. It consists of the following neighbourhoods – Moderno Predgradie (meaning Modern Suburb) (Модерно Предградие), Vrabnitsa (Връбница) & Obelya (Обеля).
