= Kostinbrod =

- Location of Kostinbrod
- Coordinates: 42°49′N 23°13′E
- Country: Bulgaria
- Province (Oblast): Sofia Province

Government
  - Mayor: Trayko Mladenov (GERB)
- Elevation: 548 m (1,798 ft)

Population (15.12.2014)
  - Total: 11,805
- Time zone: UTC+2 (EET)
  - Summer (DST): UTC+3 (EEST)
- Postal Code: 2230
- Area code: 0721

Kostinbrod (Bulgarian: Костинброд [ˈkɔstinbrot]) is a town in western Bulgaria. It is the seat of Kostinbrod Municipality. It is located 15 km west of the capital city of Sofia. It is located on two important transport corridors: Lom — Sofia — Thessaloniki and Sofia — Belgrade. The international railway line to Western Europe passes through the municipality, with a train stop at Kostinbrod Station.

The town is crossed by two rivers, the Blato in the north and the Belitsa in the south, both tributaries of the Iskar River.

According to the legends, the town was founded by a certain Kosta, who settled near the crossing (брод, brod) of the Belitsa, thus giving the name to the town (Kostinbrod means "Kosta's ford"). There he opened a pub that became popular among the merchants arriving in the capital, some of them settling and organizing a village, whose centre of the time is now located west of the road between Sofia and Lom. Historically, an early reference to the locality (as КостаЪ БРОДЪ) can be found in Tsar Ivan Alexander of Bulgaria's Oryahov Charter of 1 December 1348.

The economy of Kostinbrod was largely based on poultry farming and stock breeding during the Communist period, but a number of factories, including a 120,000 m^{2} Coca-Cola one, have emerged in democratic times due to the town's favourable position and the liberal zoning policy of the municipality.

Kostinbrod is also known for the mineral waters in the area. Thermae were built in the Izvoro country in Roman times.

== History ==
Kostinbrod has been known for its mineral waters since Roman times. To the south of it, on its outskirts, passed an ancient Roman road to Constantinople. In the Izvoro area, opposite today's Coca-Cola plant, there was a Roman bath, the remains of which are still visible today.

In Kostinbrod there are two unique ancient monuments - the late Roman Residence Skretiska (palatium Scretisca) of Constantine the Great and the Road Station Skretiska (Mutatio Scretisca) (the first stop west of Serdica on the ancient trans-Balkan diagonal road), as well as the early Byzantine settlement Krati. In antiquity, this area was fertile, near a hot mineral spring and an important road to the right bank of the Belitsa River, a tributary of the Blato River.

Important periods: Residence Skretiska (4th–5th century AD), Unfortified village, Early Byzantine fortified settlement Kratiskara.

There are many reasons why researchers refer to the fact that the Residence Skretiska was the preferred place of residence of Constantine the Great during his visits to Serdica and that it originated as an imperial residence, among which is that the years of its construction coincide with the beginning of his long stays in Serdica, and his famous phrase "Serdica is my Rome!" is well known. Among the materials from the end of the 3rd - beginning of the 4th century, discovered during the archeological research in 1973 - 1978 under the direction of arch. Violeta Bozhilova paleoornithologist Prof. Zlatozar Boev has found a well-preserved skull of a Great white pelican Pelecanus onocrotalus. Probably the residence was maintained by the governor of the province of Serdica. It is also possible that the palatium / praetorium Scretisca was used by the bishops-delegates of the Council of Serdica (343).

The main architectural complex of the residence - palatium Scretisca, is one of the most impressive examples of representative late Roman residential architecture (141/110 m) - the most remarkable country residence in the province of Inner Dacia or Mediterranean Dacia (Inner Dacia or Dacia Mediterranea) in hinterland of its capital Serdica and the largest, among the known peristyle residential complexes from the Antiquity of the Balkans with a large hall (aula), dining room (triclinum) with a complicated, probably triconch plan, numerous living quarters (cubicula), bathhouse ( balneum), a huge yard (peristylium) with an area of 4.5 decares, with a garden (hortus) and monumental entrances. The total area of the floor mosaics found in the northern peristyle exceeds 1000 m^{2}, and the total length of the peristyle and the outer southern portico is more than 400 m. The residence is the core of an impressive villa complex and the center of an impressive mansion (fundus dominium). A round plan (diameter 32 m), tentatively called "Rotunda" (Bozhilova / Vitski, 1985), probably with memorial or cult functions, located 100 m south of the residence, as well as a necropolis, were also studied. A strong ubiquitous fire destroyed the residence, which coincided with the time for which, according to written sources, during the Hun invasions in the 1940s, Serdica was also damaged.

The road station Sretisca ("Mutatio per / ad Scretisca") - "for the residence" is located 1000 m south of the residence, it was probably built for its service with the main purpose taberna - inn with several rooms and a courtyard. Scretisca is mentioned in the guidebook Hinerarium Burdigalense (333). The earliest coins found here date from the time of Emperor Constantine the Great.

The early Byzantine fortified settlement of Kratiskara (ΚΡΑΤΙΣΚΑΡΑ) retained with small changes the name of the Roman residence and the name of the Roman station Scretisca, and during its construction the remains of the earlier residence were reused. It probably appeared in the second quarter of the 6th century AD, mentioned in the sources by Procopius of Caesarea as πολιχνιον (town) of ΚΡΑΤΙΣΚΑΡΑ, on the remains of the Roman residence and played the role of a local administrative center. Life probably stopped during the Slavic invasions in the late 570s to early 580s AD. Valuable evidence of the fortification system, construction, fortress towers, residential and guard rooms has been preserved.

According to legend, the town of Kostinbrod was founded by a man named Kosta, who long ago settled near the ford across the Belitsa River (now at the entrance to the city from the direction of Sofia). There he built a roadside pub, and the place became a favorite for many merchants arriving in the capital. People began to call it Kostinbrod for a short time, instead of "on the ford at Costa". The village of Kostinbrod was gradually established. Today the center of the then village is located east of Lom road. Also nearby is the Shiyakovo Monastery, where Vasil Levski founded a revolutionary committee.

During the years of socialism, the idea was to turn Kostinbrod into a big city. That is why the village is united with the neighboring villages of Shiyakovtsi and Maslovo (today neighborhoods of the town). People from the Balkan villages in the area are also settling in the new town. Even today, starting west from Lomski Pat, deviating at the crossroads "Belitsa" in the direction of the neighborhoods "Shiyakovtsi" and "Maslovo", you have to travel about 4 km on the road, which on both sides has several row of houses.

The Maslovo neighborhood occupies the northwestern part of the city, between the Shiyakovtsi neighborhood and the village of Petarch. There is a stadium and a dam.

Over the years, Kostinbrod has been known as the city with the utopian ideas of the Bulgarian Communist Party for great successes in poultry and animal husbandry. Near the territory of the municipality there are an institute of poultry farming, a poultry factory, an institute of animal husbandry, hybrid centers. Earlier, the largest institute of berry crops on the Balkan Peninsula was located here. Under the patronage of Todor Zhivkov, one of the largest institutes of its time was established, called the Institute for Cereals and Feed Industry, which is in critical condition today. In the 1990s, many of the other institutes ceased operations.

== Gallery ==
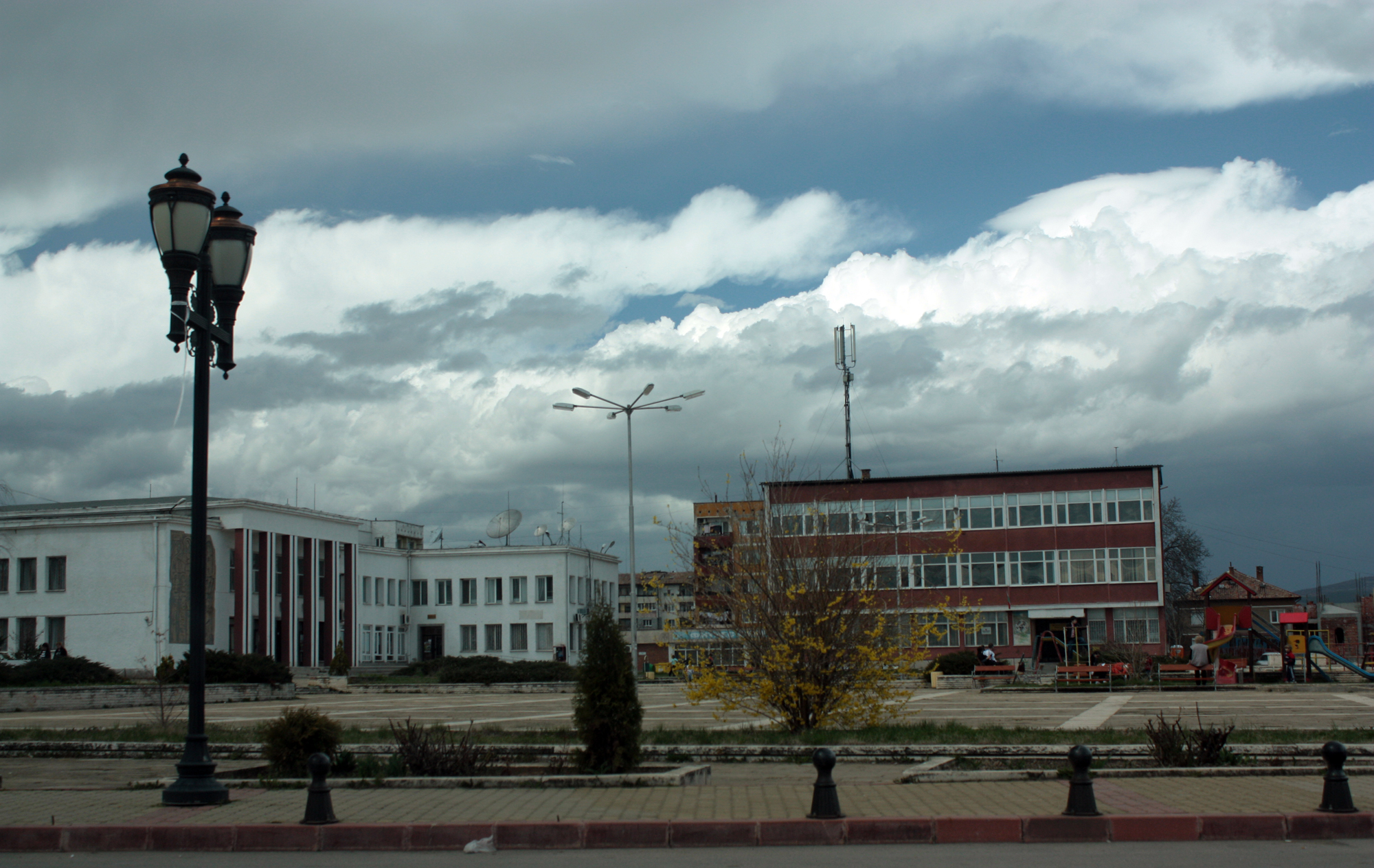
Central square of Kostinbrod

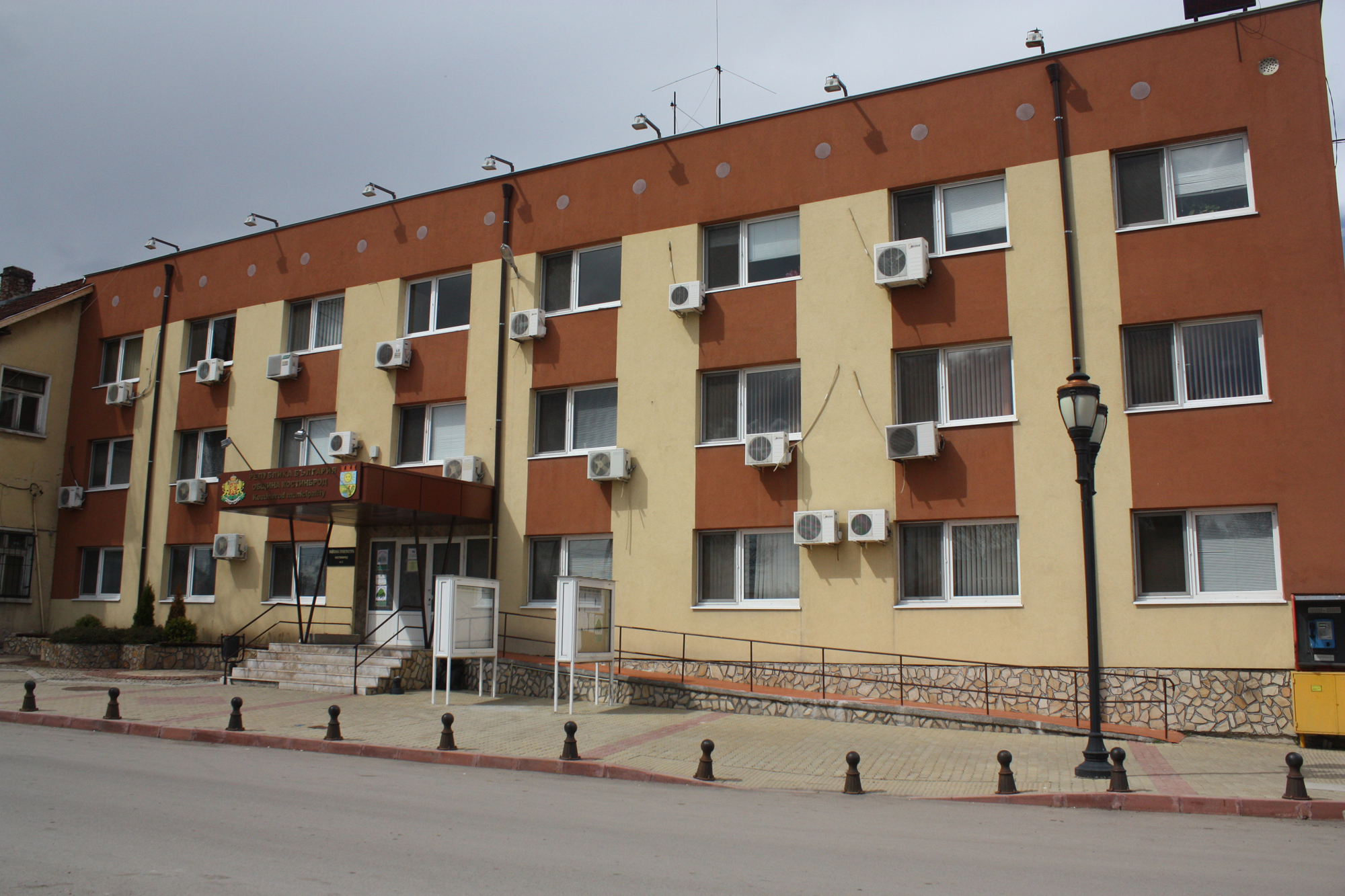
Kostinbrod Town Hall (Municipality office)

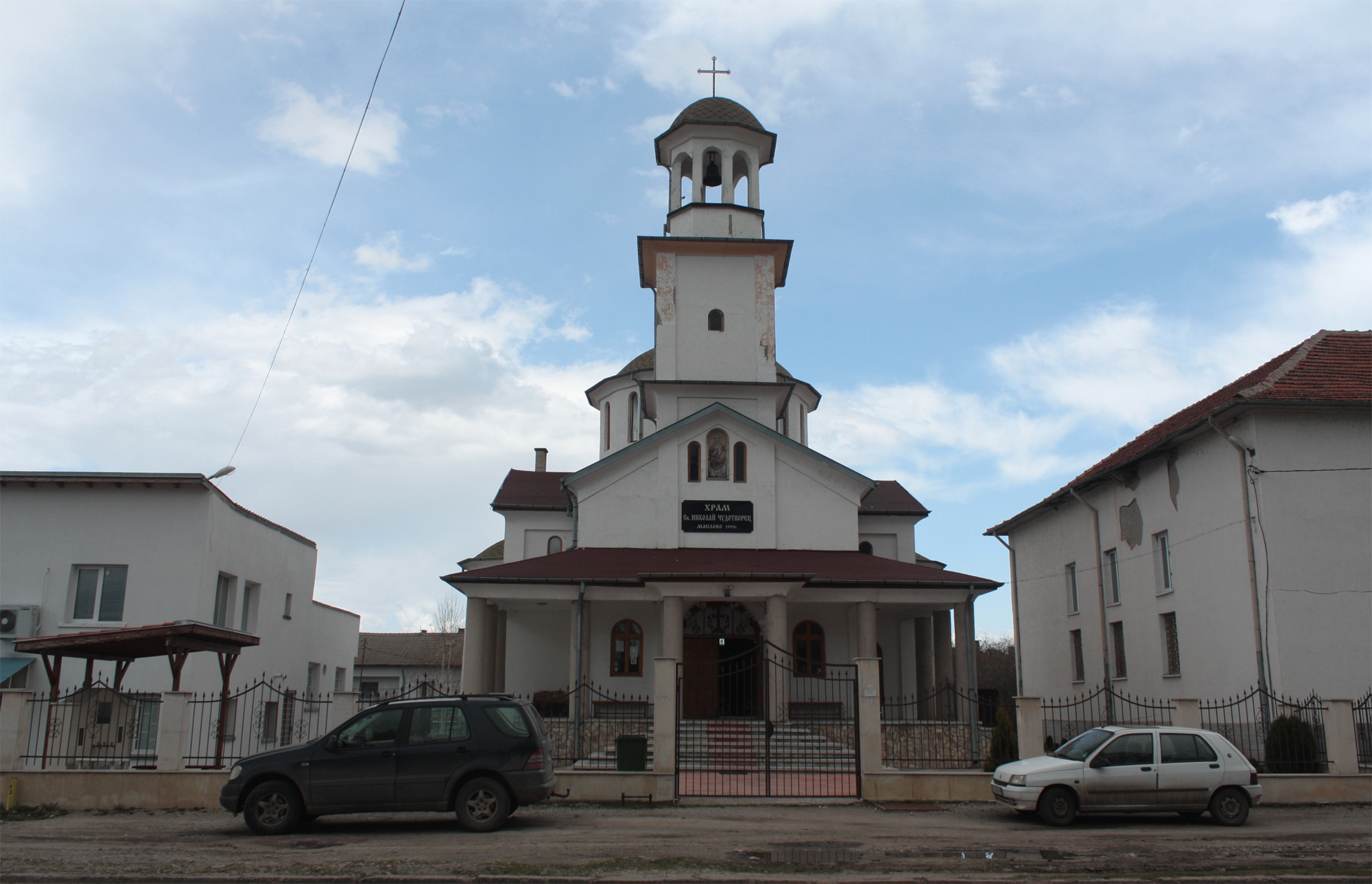
Kostinbrod Maslovo district Saint Nicolas church

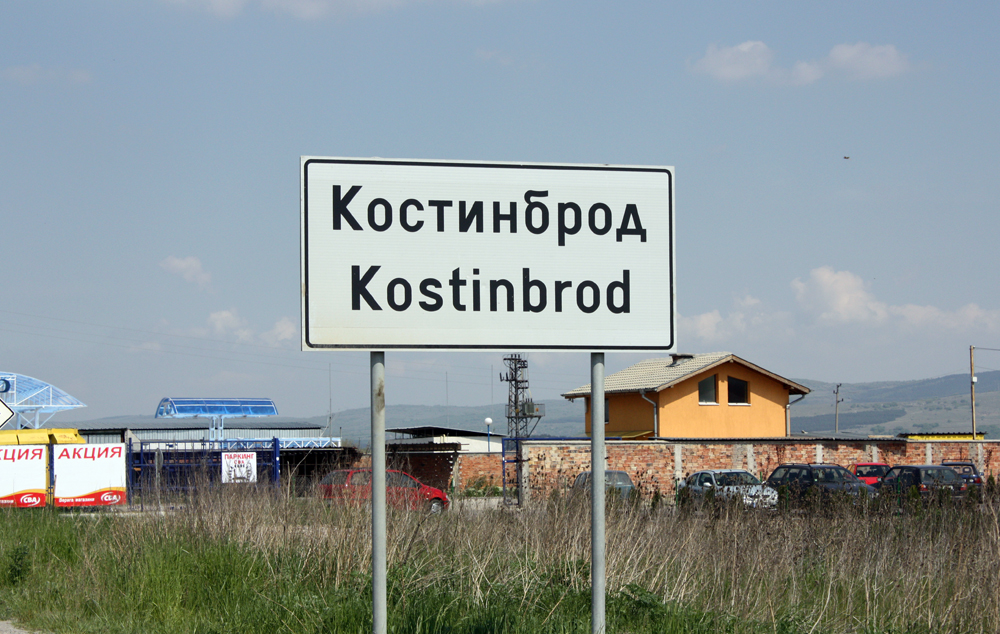
Kostinbrod entrance from Sofia

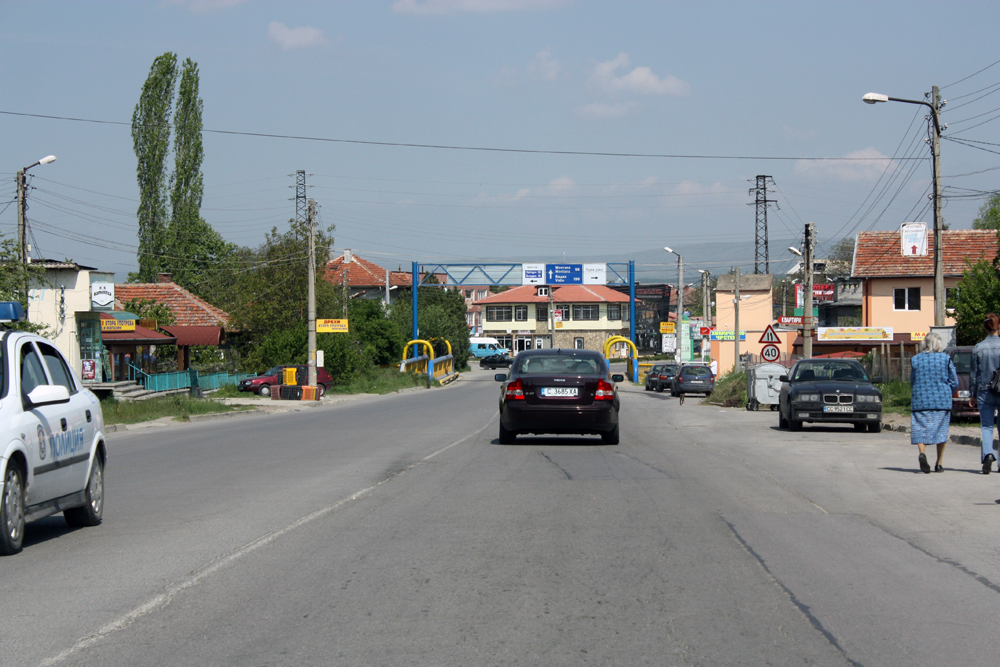
Kostinbrod main street

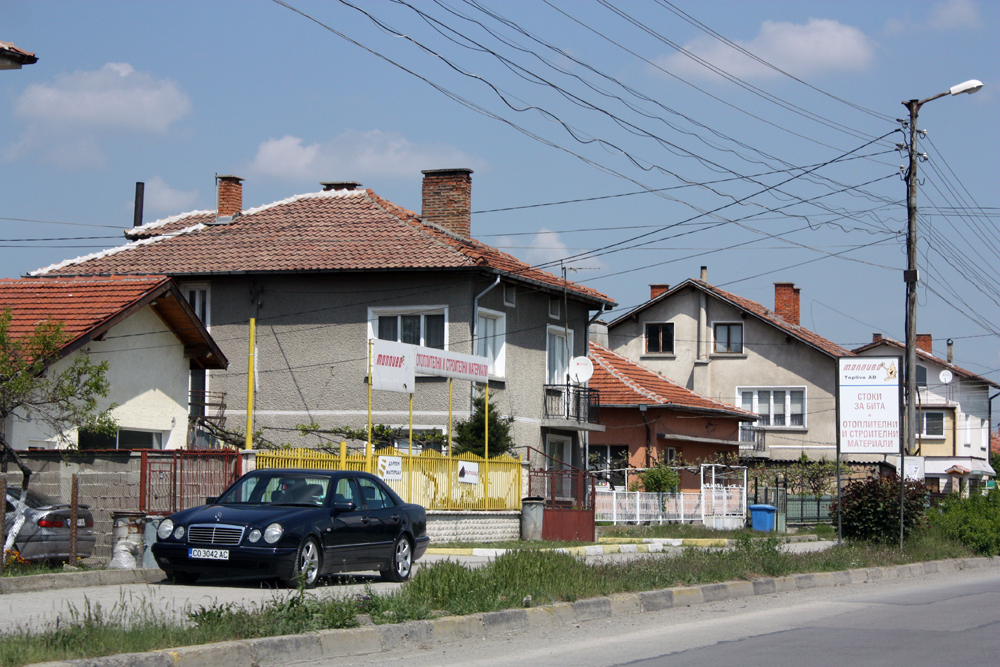
A Kostinbrod street with typical family houses
