= Janja Monastery =

Serbian Orthodox monastery in Nova Varoš, Serbia

Coordinates: 43.5175°N 19.6939°E

Janja Јања
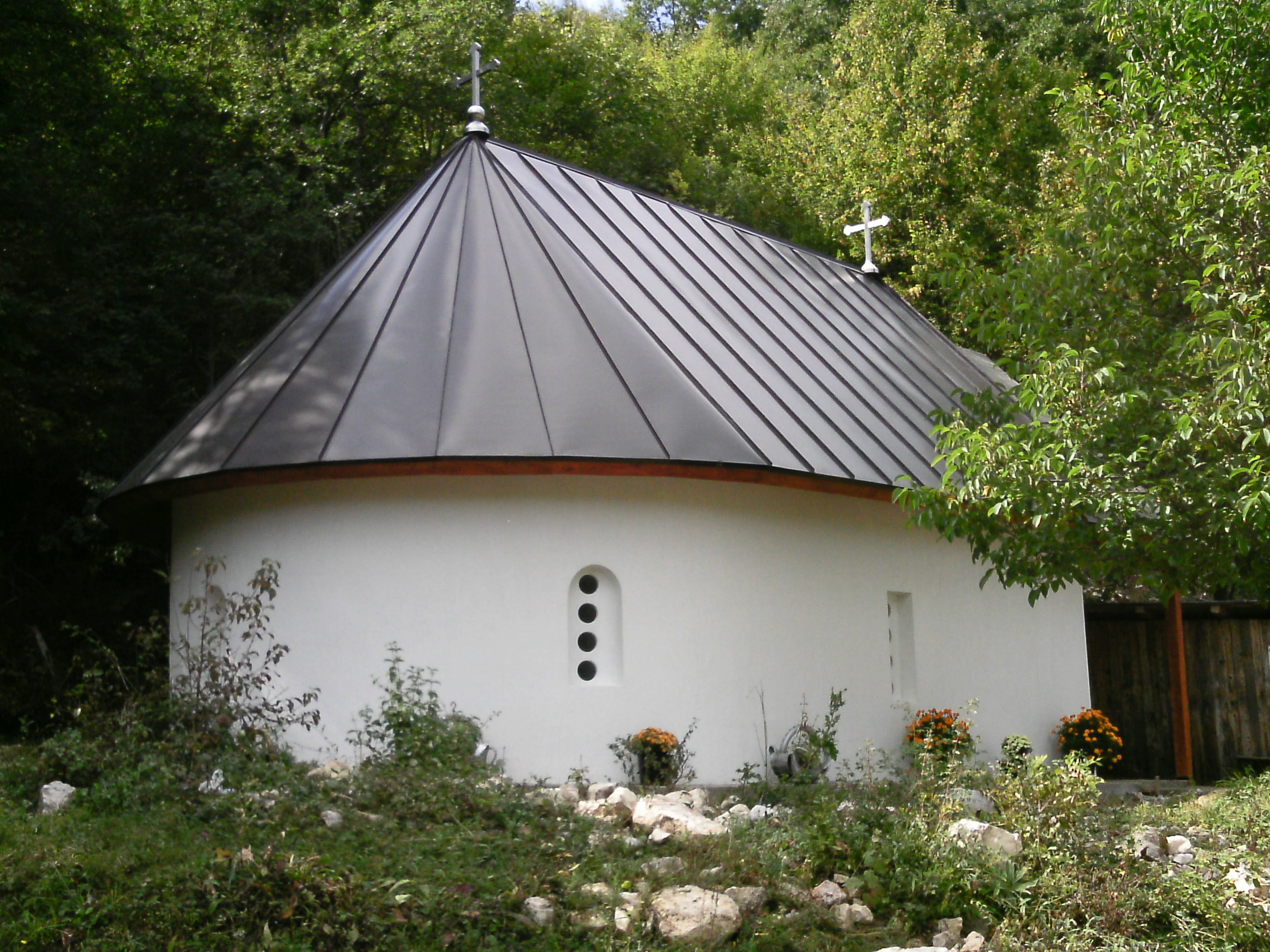
- Exterior of the monastery

Religion
- Affiliation: Serbian Orthodox Church
- District: Eparchy of Mileševa

Location
- Location: Nova Varoš, Serbia
- Interactive map of Janja; Јања

Architecture
- Type: Byzantine
- Style: Raška architectural school
- Completed: 2012

The Janja Monastery (Serbian: Манастир Јања, romanized: Manastir Janja) is a Serbian Orthodox monastery located in Nova Varoš in southwestern Serbia. The monastery belongs to the Eparchy of Mileševa and is dedicated to the Righteous parents of the Holy Mother of God, Joachim and Anne. It is assumed it was built in the 15th century, and it was destroyed at the end of 17th century. in 1993, archaeological excavations of the site began, while in 2008 the restoration of the monastery began, finally being finished on July 22, 2012.

== Geography ==
It is located in the village of Rutoši in the Nova Varoš municipality, and is bordered to the villages Seništa and Radoinja. It is situated on the left bank of the river Uvac, in the historical region of Raška.

== Early history ==
Little is known of the history of the monastery. Based on the architecture and furnishing of the church, it is assumed that it was first built in the mid- or late 15th century, and it was then destroyed at the end of 17th century. In the Gospel of Žitomislić Monastery in Herzegovina, it is said that the book was written in the Uvac monastery in 1671. In Serbian epic poetry about the Nemanjić dynasty era, and according to local tradition, it is known as the "Janja Church in Stari Vlah".

== Archaeological excavations ==
With the project "The holy waters of Lim", a team of experts from the National Museum in Užice began archaeological excavations at the site, at the estate of Sreten and Petronije Gordić-Pinjević, on July 5, 1993. On that occasion, the team unearthed the single-nave structure, fundamentals 9.30 meters by 6 meters below the "Janja rock", and found a marble table of composed of three elements, parts of a candle holder and chandeliers, fragments of pottery vessels, while on the walls in the lower reaches remains of frescoes were discovered.

== Restoration ==
The restoration of the monastery began on October 2, 2008, with a liturgy served by bishop Filaret Mićević and the monastic brotherhood of the Eparchy of Mileševa. On Epiphany, 2011, the church and crosses were raised and consecrated, after which the finishing work on the facade temple and interior design began. The iconostasis and the chandelier were painted by iconographer and fresco painter Ivan Kovalčik Mileševac from Novi Sad. Through the efforts of prioress Justina Petković, with financial support of Nebojsa Grujović and entrepreneurs from the Rutoši village, and financial contributions of locals of Seništa, Rutoši and Radoinja, the largest part of work on the monastery church was secured. On July 22, 2012, the monastery reconstruction was finished.

== See also ==
- List of Serbian Orthodox monasteries
