= Kovalčík =

Kovalčík (feminine: Kovalčíková) is a Czech and Slovak surname. Kovalčik is a Serbian surname. Notable people with these surnames include:

- Ivan Kovalčik Mileševac (born 1968), Serbian painter
- Štefan Kovalčík (1921–1973), Slovak cross country skier
- Zak Kovalcik (born 1983), American track cyclist
