= Lazaret Meljine =

- Lazaret Meljine
- Location: Meljine (Herceg Novi)
- Country: Montenegro
- Website: https://www.lazure.me/

History
- Status: on reconstruction
- Founded: 1700-1732

Architecture
- Style: Mediterranean

Lazaret Meljine is a fortress and a military hospital built by the Venetians in 1732 near the town of Herceg Novi (Montenegro) in the village of Meljine on the beach. This institution performed quarantine functions, and also gave permission for the import or export of various products. Lazaret survived to this day.

== Location ==
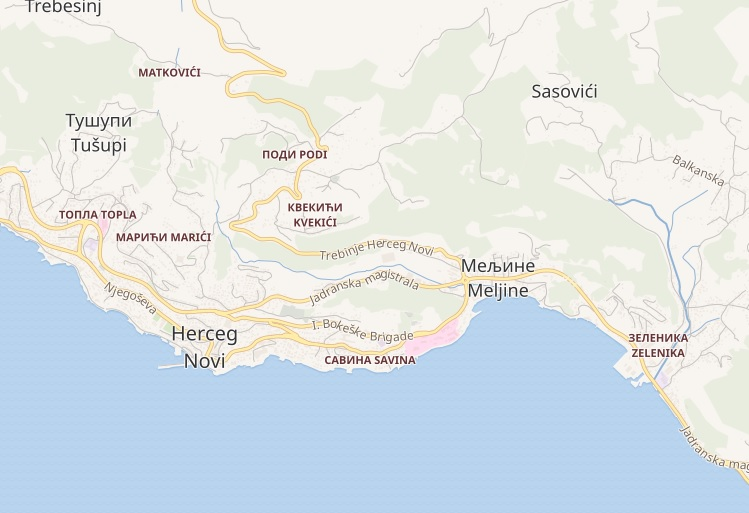

Meljine is a small tourist place on the Montenegrin riviera in the Bay of Kotor, not far from the town of Herceg Novi.

This settlement is located on the coast in three kilometers to the east of the town of Herceg Novi and two kilometers to the west of the village of Zelenika. From here, along the "Pet Danica" embankment you can reach the Igalo resort through Herceg Novi. The cultural and historical monument Lazaret, dating from 1732, is located exactly here. In Meljine, since the days of the Venetian Republic, there is a large hospital, which still operates today.

From Meljine through the Orjen mountain you can get to Trebinje in Bosnia and Herzegovina (Republika Srpska). This 150 km road shortens the existing route from Serbia and Bosnia and Herzegovina to the Montenegrin coast.

== History ==
The territory around Kotor was under the rule of Venice from 1420. In 1482 Herceg Novi was conquered by the Ottoman Empire and held for two centuries with a brief break in 1538-1539, when the city was captured by the Spaniards. Only in 1688 the Venetians freed the city from the Turks and included Herceg Novi in the Venetian Republic as part of the province "Venetian Albania" or "Albania Veneta".

In 1688 when the Venetians managed to conquer Herceg Novi from Ottoman Empire, there was a need to complete the restructuring of the Turkish public welfare which didn’t answer the modern standards of that time. Public health was one of the most important tasks for the new authorities. Moreover, releasing Herceg Novi, the first city at the entrance to the Bay of Kotor, Venetians wanted to make this city the port. Therefore city needed quarantine, namely, to give permission for the import and export of various goods.

First quarantine which was called Lazaret was organized in 1700 and was placed in Herceg Novi, near the old town, just below the Catholic Monastery of St. Anthony. In a few years it was decided to take it apart due to the danger of landslide as Herceg Novi is situated on the cliff and consists of solid slopes, hence it is often called the city of 10 000 steps. New Lazaret was built in 3 years between 1729 and 1732 in the suburbs of the city in the village of Meljine right on the shore of the sea. It was a whole complex of buildings with the atrium and chapel. Outwardly, it resembled a small fortress, the only difference is that the walls were not as high and didn’t have the battlements. Great Lazaret building has survived in the same shape to our days. In the next century the Austrians, new owners of Lazaret, used this building for military purposes.

The Lazaret often changed its owners, it can be said that it had a difficult fate. In 1797 the province of Venetian Albania became part of the Napoleonic Kingdom of Italy, and then in 1809 was incorporated into the French Illyrian regions. In 1814 they became part of the Austrian Empire, and then, after WWI from 1918 to Yugoslavia before its collapse. In this period it was used as children’s summer camp.

== Aqueduct ==
In 1741, to Lazaret in Meljine, a water pipe was installed from the Savina monastery next to it, which was a progressive innovation for that time. The huge building of the Lazaret was perfectly preserved to this day, but the water pipe no longer functions.

== Architecture ==
For the construction of the hospital in Meljine, the Venetians used carved stone from which the monks of nearby Savina monastery also built a new church.

The architecture of the ancient infirmary in Meljine, like the military hospital of that time, resembles a defensive fortress. Behind the imposing walls is a large hospital building, in which prudent Venetian architects have made not only the main entrance, but also a safety exit.

There are also three smaller buildings here. In addition, the internal courtyard of the old hospital in Meljine is decorated with a fountain and a small chapel dedicated to St. Rock.

The hospital in Meljine near Herceg Novi can be reached from the sea. For this, the Venetians built two piers for ships. From the side of these berths there are views of the Herceg Novi hospital, with its green vegetation. Evergreen pines sometimes grow directly from the walls of the old infirmary and give the architecture of this structure the color of the ancient fortress.

== Tourism ==
Now, in place of the old Lazaret reconstruction and construction of a tourist complex is underway. In the building of Lazaret there will be a 5-star boutique hotel with residences, Mediterranean restaurants, and a wellness center.

== See also ==
- Savina Monastery, Montenegro
- Saint Roch
