= Dubnica Monastery =

Serbian Orthodox monastery in Božetići, Serbia

Coordinates: 43.4410°N 19.9584°E

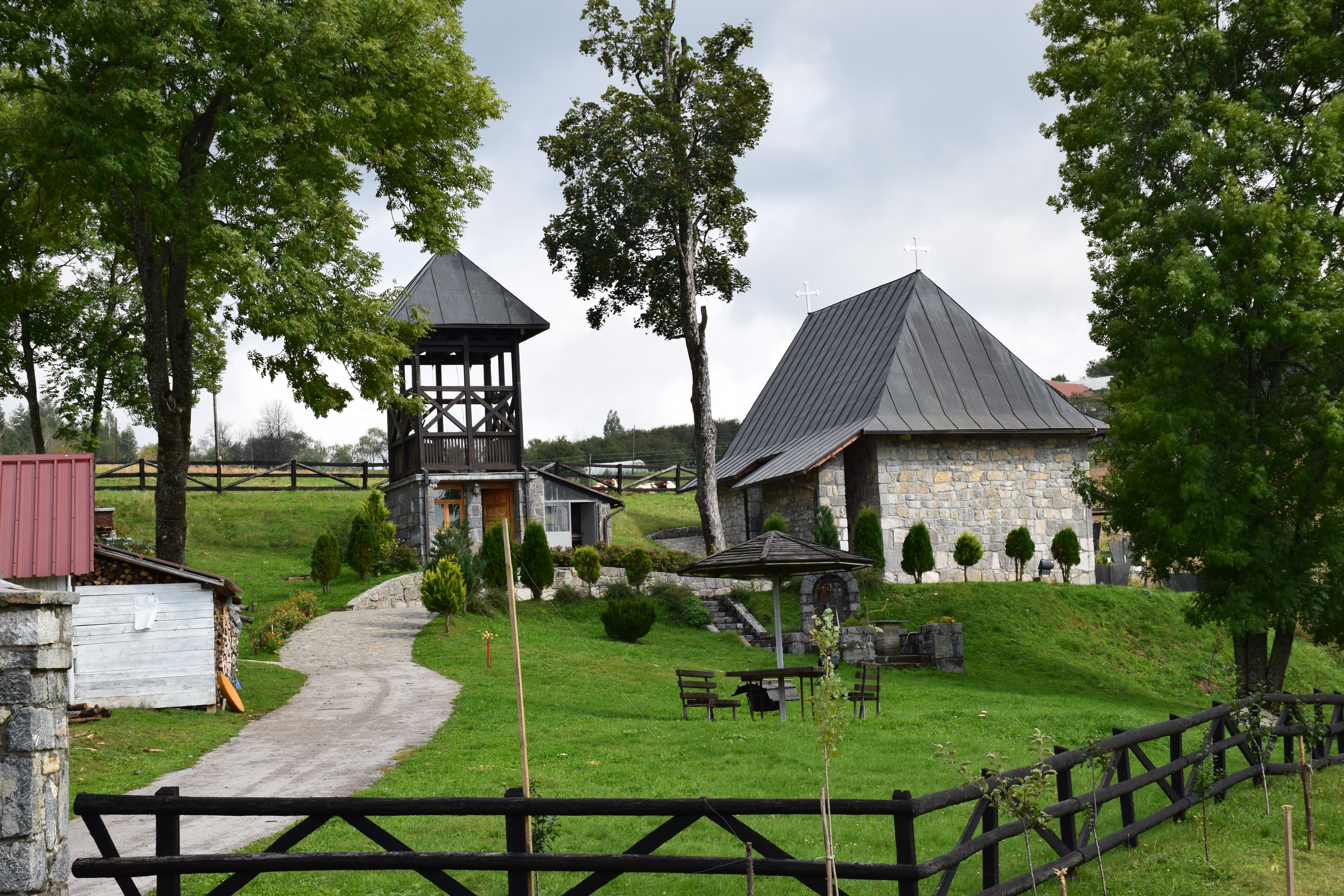
Manastir Dubnica

The Dubnica Monastery (Serbian Cyrillic: Манастир Дубница, romanized: Manastir Dubnica) is a Serbian Orthodox monastery located in Božetići, in southwestern Serbia. It is ecclesiastically part of the Eparchy of Mileševa. It was built in the mid-17th century by Serbian Patriarch Gavrilo I (1648–1655).

== Geography ==
The monastery is located in the village of Božetići, between Zlatar and Javor mountains, next to the Nova Varoš-Ivanjica road.

== History ==
It was built in the mid-17th century by Serbian Patriarch Gavrilo I (1648–1655), who hailed from the village of Štitkovo. It was later destroyed by the Ottomans.

== Restoration ==
After research and conservation work undertaken by experts from the Institute for Protection of Cultural Monuments of Kraljevo, restoration of the monastery began in September 2003, with help of the Eparchy of Mileševa, the Municipal Assembly Nova Varoš, villagers and donor headed by Mićo Zorić, chairman of the building committee for the restoration. The monastery foundation of the demolished church, according to the project architect Veljko Vucković, was built with stone and rubble by stonecutter Milijan Djoković from Sirogojno and his group of masters. The interior was worked by wood-carver Miroslav Trbušić from Kragujevac, and the icons and iconostasis were painted by iconographer Ivan Kovalčik Mileševac from Novi Sad.

Restoration of the monastery Dubnica ended August 4, 2007, on the feast day of St. Mary Magdalene, with the act of consecration was done by bishop Filaret Mićević and the monastic brotherhood of the Eparchy of Mileševa.

== See also ==
- List of Serbian Orthodox monasteries
