= Simeon Lazović =

Serbian painter

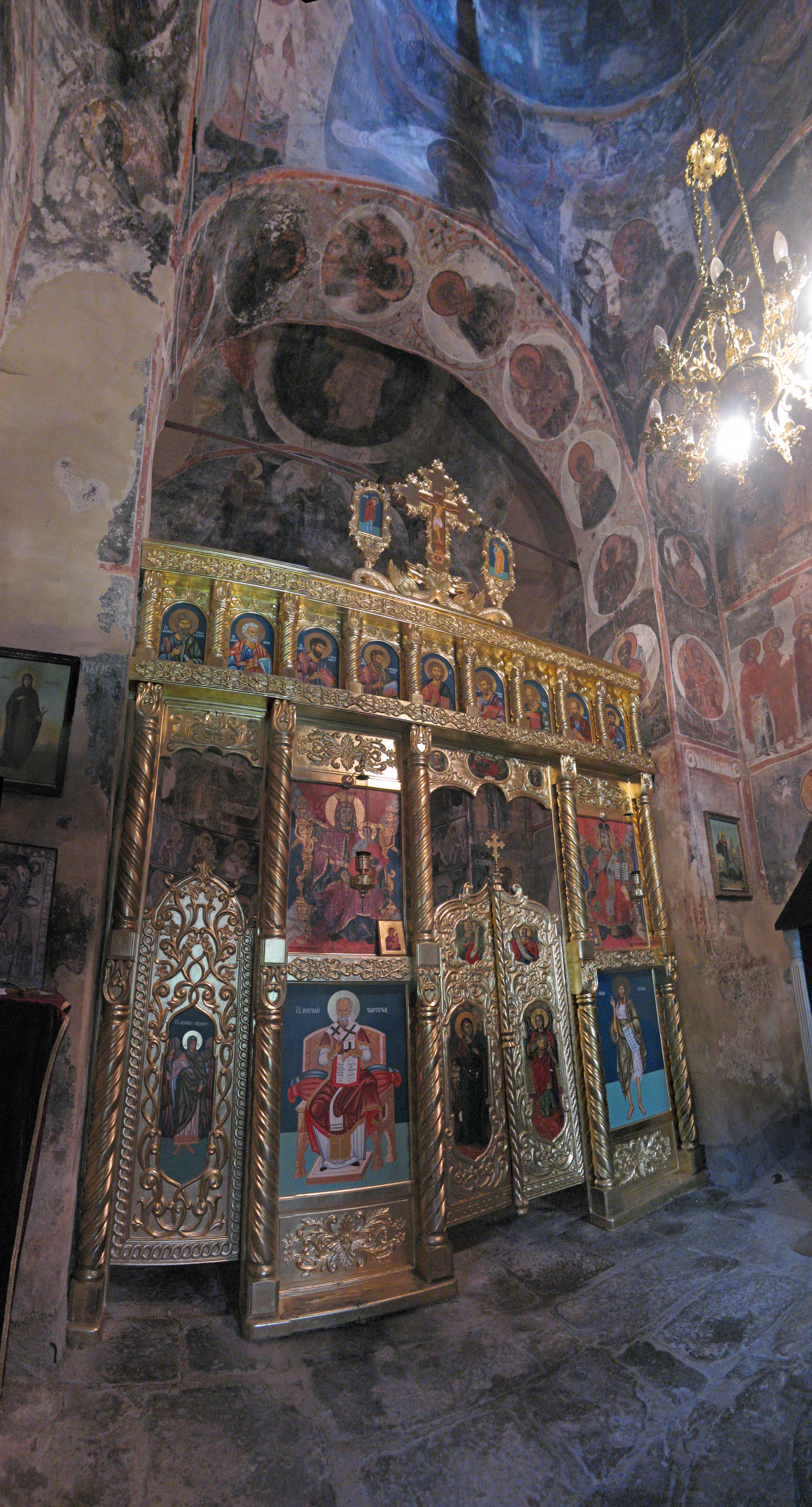
The iconostasis of the Church of St. Nicholas, Brezova, 1805

Simeon Lazović (Serbian Cyrillic: Симеон Лазовић; c. 1745 – 1817) was a Serbian painter and one of the most famous icon painters of his time in Southeastern Europe.

== Biography ==
Born in Bijelo Polje in the Ottoman Empire, (modern-day Montenegro), the priest Simeon Lazović and his son Aleksije are best known for having painted the icons of the altar screens (iconostases) and the walls of St. Dimitrius and St. Nicholas Serbian Orthodox chapels in Kosovo. Most of the icons belong to the eighteenth and early nineteenth centuries; the best among them were done by Simeon Lazović at the end of the eighteenth century. His style continued the tradition of Byzantine painting. He is the father of the painter Aleksije Lazović.

== Works ==
Among the works painted by Simeon Lazović are icons preserved in the wooden church of Kućani in 1780 and in the church of Sirogojno in 1764 in the Zlatibor Mountains. He also worked at the iconostasis of the Klisura Monastery in the Church of St. Achillius in Arilje or that of the Monastery of the Holy Trinity of Pljevlja. With his son Aleksije, he painted the iconostases of both Saint Demetrius and Saint Nicolas chapels at the Dečani monastery (Kosovo) and the iconostasis of the Savina monastery church near Herceg Novi in Boka Kotorska (Montenegro) in 1795. Also, he is the author of the 1805 iconostasis and frescoes for the Church of St. Nicholas in Brezova, and many more throughout Dalmatia, Montenegro, Bosnia and Herzegovina and Serbia.

== See also ==
- Aleksije Lazović
- List of painters from Serbia
