= Božetići =

- Village
- Location within Serbia
- Coordinates: 43°27′N 19°56′E
- Country: Serbia
- District: Zlatibor District
- Municipality: Nova Varoš

Population (2002)
  - Total: 392
- Time zone: UTC+1 (CET)
  - Summer (DST): UTC+2 (CEST)

Božetići is a village in the municipality of Nova Varoš, western Serbia. According to the 2002 census, the village has a population of 392 people.

== See also ==
- Dubnica Monastery
