= Ojkovica =

- Village
- Location within Serbia
- Coordinates: 43°31′16″N 19°53′22″E
- Country: Serbia
- District: Zlatibor District
- Municipality: Nova Varoš
- Elevation: 3,885 ft (1,184 m)

Population (2002)
  - Total: 290
- Time zone: UTC+1 (CET)
  - Summer (DST): UTC+2 (CEST)
- Area code: 033
- Vehicle registration: NV

Ojkovica is a village in the municipality of Nova Varoš, western Serbia. According to the 2002 census, the village has a population of 290 people.
