= Aleksije Lazović =

Serbian painter (1774–1837)

Aleksije Lazović (Serbian Cyrillic: Алексије Лазовић; 1774–1837) was a Serbian painter from modern-day Montenegro. He is particularly famous for his icons.

== Biography ==
Aleksije Lazović was born in Bijelo Polje, Ottoman Empire, to Serbian parents; the son of the painter Simeon Lazović.

Among the works painted by Aleksije Lazović is the iconostasis of the Church of the Dormition-of-the-Mother-of-God at the Reževići Monastery, near Petrovac na Moru or the Uspanie Bogomatere Church in Šibenik, Croatia. With his father, he painted the iconostasis of Saint Demetrius and Saint Nicholas chapels at the Dečani monastery in Kosovo and the iconostasis of the Savina monastery church near Herceg Novi.

He is also the author of an icon of the Virgin, painted in 1806 and in imitation of a painting attributed to Saint Luke; this work is preserved in the Museum Treasury of the Patriarchate of Peć. Works by Aleksije Lazović are also preserved in the churches of Dobroselica, Mačkat and Bela Reka on the Zlatibor mountains, and the iconostasis he painted in the Monastery of Nikoljac in Bijelo Polje in 1837.

The iconostases of Dečani are the most grandiose works and most beautiful of Simeon and Alexis Lazović who, between 1764 and 1837, executed numerous iconostasis in churches in Dalmatia, Montenegro, Bosnia and Herzegovina and Serbia. Being given their conceptions of pictorial art, these painters of icons continued iconography's post-Byzantine tradition, adapting models to the taste of their customers by modernizing them, that is, using the post-Baroque form practiced by engravers and painters who worked the territory subject to the spiritual authority of the Metropolitanate of Karlovci.

The iconostasis of the Dečani Monastery, to a large extent, complements the image of the activity of the painters Lazović and allows us to judge their work with objectivity, as it reflects the social and spiritual conditions in which they lived and displayed their talents.

== Gallery ==
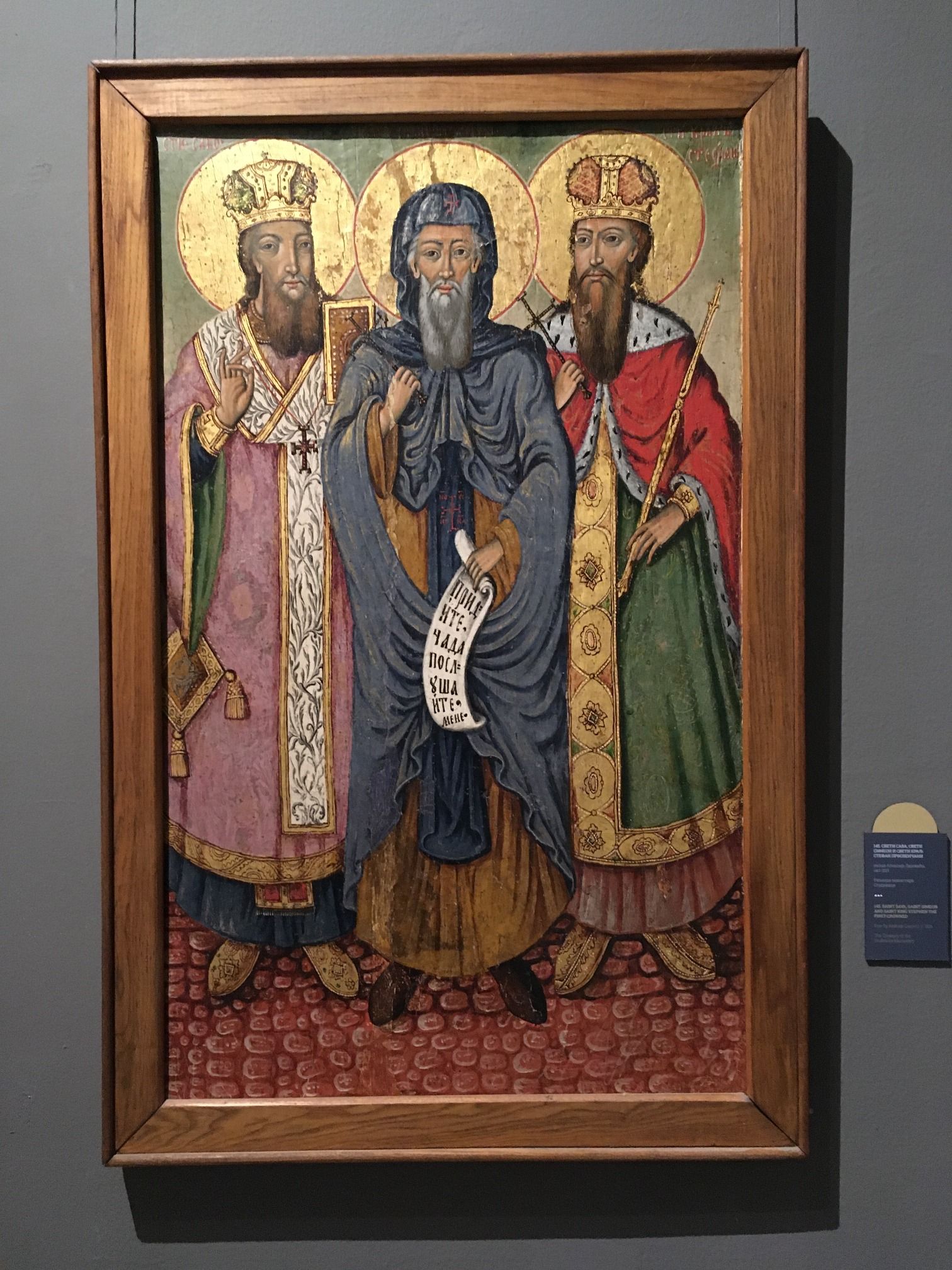
Saint Sava, Saint Symeon and Stefan the First-Crowned, 1819

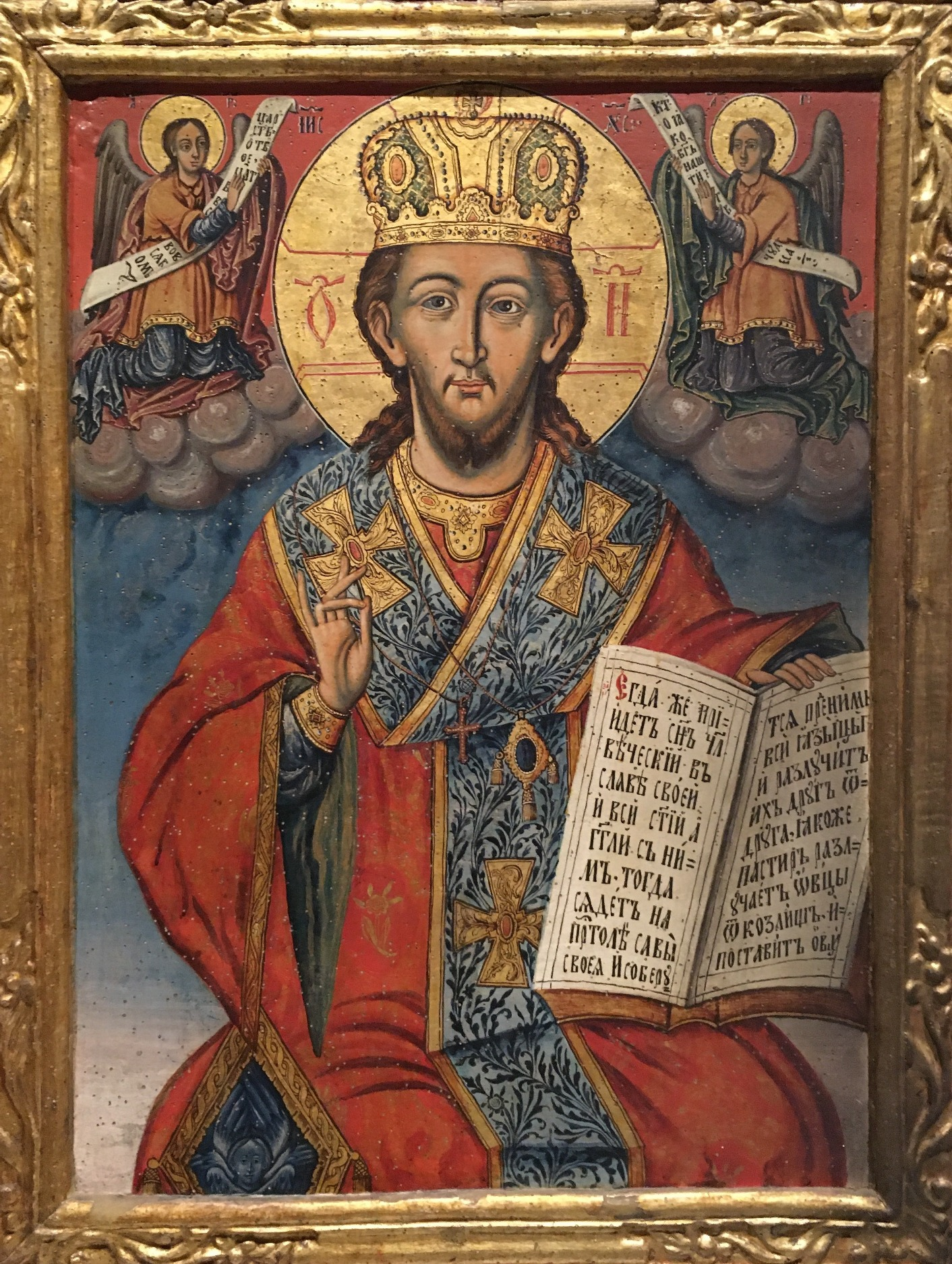
Christ, emperor of emperors and great archpriest, 1819

== See also ==
- Simeon Lazović
- List of painters from Serbia
