= Nova Varoš =

Nova Varoš Нова Варош (Serbian)
- Town and municipality
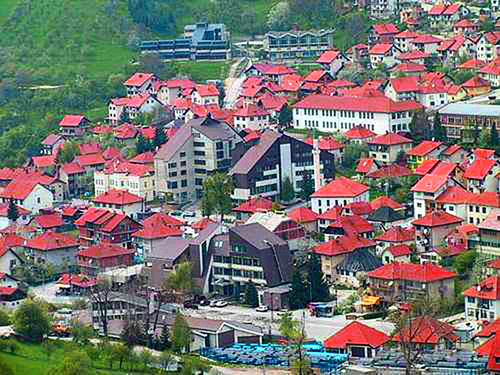
- Nova Varoš

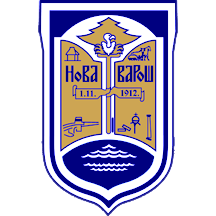
- Coat of arms

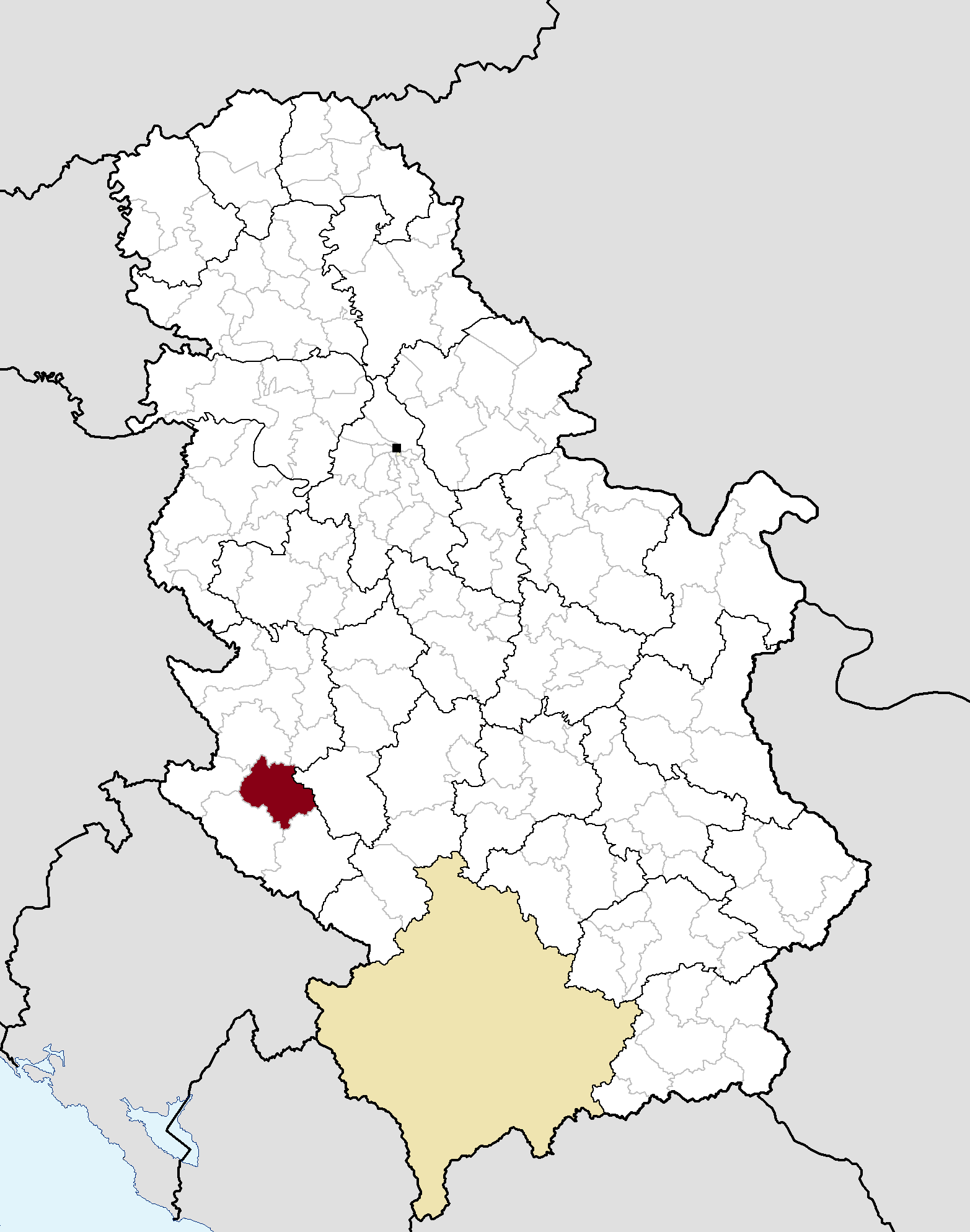
- Location of the municipality of Nova Varoš within Serbia
- Coordinates: 43°27.625′N 19°48.923′E
- Country: Serbia
- Region: Šumadija and Western Serbia
- District: Zlatibor
- Settlements: 32

Government
  - Mayor: Branko Bjelić (SNS)

Area
  - Town: 3.79 km^{2} (1.46 sq mi)
  - Municipality: 581 km^{2} (224 sq mi)
- Elevation: 1,111 m (3,645 ft)

Population (2022 census)
  - Town: 7,542
  - Town density: 1,990/km^{2} (5,150/sq mi)
  - Municipality: 13,507
  - Municipality density: 23.2/km^{2} (60.2/sq mi)
- Time zone: UTC+1 (CET)
  - Summer (DST): UTC+2 (CEST)
- Postal code: 31320
- Area code: +381(0)33
- Car plates: NV
- Website: www.novavaros.rs

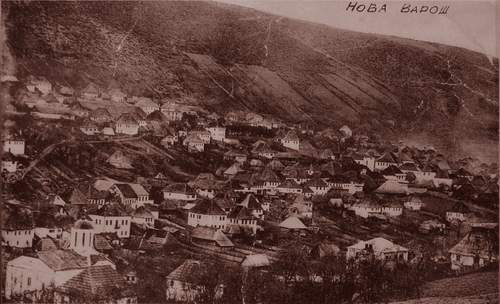
Nova Varoš in 1930s

Nova Varoš (Serbian Cyrillic: Нова Варош, pronounced [nɔ̂v̞aː v̞ǎːrɔʃ]) is a town and municipality located in the Zlatibor District of southwestern Serbia. The municipality of Nova Varoš has a population of 13,507, while the town of Nova Varoš itself has a population of 7,542 inhabitants.

== History ==
Nova Varoš was founded in the middle of the 16th century. It is associated with the name of Skender Pasha of Genoa. When Skender-pasha, travelling from Bosnia to the Ottoman capital of Constantinople (1530), stopped with his entourage on the plateau below the mountain Zlatar and was delighted with the beauty of this wooded area and the intoxicating smell of pine, he ordered a town to be built there. Settlements soon sprang up on the site of today's Nova Varoš. It was called Skender-pašina palanka (Skender-pasha's Palanka). When it grew to close to 2,000 houses, "a fire broke out and burned the palace to the ground" (Evliya Çelebi). Most of the inhabitants stayed there and built a new town which they called Nova Kasaba, which in Serbian means Nova Varoš.

== Geography ==
Nova Varoš is located in southwest Serbia, the main road that connects the north of the country the Montenegrin coast. It is situated at 1000 meters above sea level, and below the northern slopes of mountain Zlatar. Nova Varoš is located in the Dinaric mountain range. North of town is mountain Murtenica, while the south mountain Zlatar.

=== Climate ===
Nova Varoš has an oceanic climate (Köppen climate classification: Cfb).

Climate data for Nova Varoš
Month	Jan	Feb	Mar	Apr	May	Jun	Jul	Aug	Sep	Oct	Nov	Dec	Year
Mean daily maximum °C (°F)	0.7 (33.3)	3.4 (38.1)	8.1 (46.6)	11.6 (52.9)	16.4 (61.5)	19.8 (67.6)	22.1 (71.8)	22.4 (72.3)	19.0 (66.2)	14.0 (57.2)	6.8 (44.2)	2.2 (36.0)	12.2 (54.0)
Daily mean °C (°F)	−2.6 (27.3)	−0.4 (31.3)	3.7 (38.7)	6.9 (44.4)	11.5 (52.7)	14.8 (58.6)	16.8 (62.2)	17.0 (62.6)	13.7 (56.7)	9.4 (48.9)	3.4 (38.1)	−0.7 (30.7)	7.8 (46.0)
Mean daily minimum °C (°F)	−5.8 (21.6)	−4.2 (24.4)	−0.6 (30.9)	2.3 (36.1)	6.7 (44.1)	9.9 (49.8)	11.6 (52.9)	11.6 (52.9)	8.5 (47.3)	4.9 (40.8)	0.0 (32.0)	−3.6 (25.5)	3.4 (38.2)
Average precipitation mm (inches)	75 (3.0)	66 (2.6)	68 (2.7)	80 (3.1)	104 (4.1)	98 (3.9)	87 (3.4)	76 (3.0)	83 (3.3)	86 (3.4)	97 (3.8)	84 (3.3)	1,004 (39.6)
Source: Climate-Data.org

== Demographics ==
Historical population
Year	Pop.	±% p.a.
1948	20,170	—
1953	21,848	+1.61%
1961	24,770	+1.58%
1971	22,740	−0.85%
1981	22,523	−0.10%
1991	21,812	−0.32%
2002	19,982	−0.79%
2011	16,638	−2.01%
2022	13,505	−1.88%

According to the last official census done in 2022, the Municipality of Nova Varoš has 13,507 inhabitants. Population density on the territory of the municipality is 23 inhabitants per square kilometer.

=== Ethnic groups ===
In 1991, the population of the municipality was composed of: Serbs and Montenegrins (89.20%), Muslims (8.5%) and others.

In 2002, the population of the municipality was composed of: Serbs (18,001) (90.1%), Bosniaks (1,028) (5.1%), ethnic Muslims (502) (2.5%) and others. Most of those who in 1991 census declared themselves as Muslims by ethnicity, in the next census in 2002 declared themselves as Bosniaks, while the smaller number of them still declare themselves as Muslims by ethnicity.

Ethnic composition of the municipality according to 2011 and 2022 censuses:

	Census 1991		Census 2011		Census 2022	
Ethnic group	Population	%	Population	%	Population	%
Serbs	19,284	88.4%	14,899	89.6%	11,901	88.1%
Bosniaks	1,857	8.5%	788	4.7%	673	5%
Muslims	1,857	8.5%	526	3.1%	308	2.3%
Yugoslavs	348	1.6%	37	0.2%	40	0.3%
Montenegrins	173	0.8%	31	0.2%	9	0.07%
Others	150	0.7%	357	2.1%	576	4.2%
Total	21,812		16,638		13,507	

== Settlements ==
Aside from the town of Nova Varoš, the municipality includes the following settlements:

- Akmačići
- Amzići
- Bistrica
- Božetići
- Brdo
- Bukovik
- Burađa
- Vilovi
- Vraneša
- Gornje Trudovo
- Debelja
- Draglica
- Draževići
- Drmanovići
- Jasenovo
- Komarani
- Kućani
- Ljepojevići
- Miševići
- Negbina
- Ojkovica
- Radijevići
- Radoinja
- Rutoši
- Seništa
- Tisovica
- Trudovo
- Čelice
- Štitkovo

== Economy ==
The following table gives a preview of total number of registered people employed in legal entities per their core activity (as of 2018):

Activity	Total
Agriculture, forestry and fishing	61
Mining and quarrying	13
Manufacturing	817
Electricity, gas, steam and air conditioning supply	110
Water supply; sewerage, waste management and remediation activities	66
Construction	75
Wholesale and retail trade, repair of motor vehicles and motorcycles	356
Transportation and storage	253
Accommodation and food services	188
Information and communication	27
Financial and insurance activities	31
Real estate activities	-
Professional, scientific and technical activities	59
Administrative and support service activities	17
Public administration and defense; compulsory social security	288
Education	220
Human health and social work activities	190
Arts, entertainment and recreation	54
Other service activities	35
Individual agricultural workers	151
Total	3,010

== Culture ==
- Janja Monastery
- Dubnica Monastery

== Gallery ==
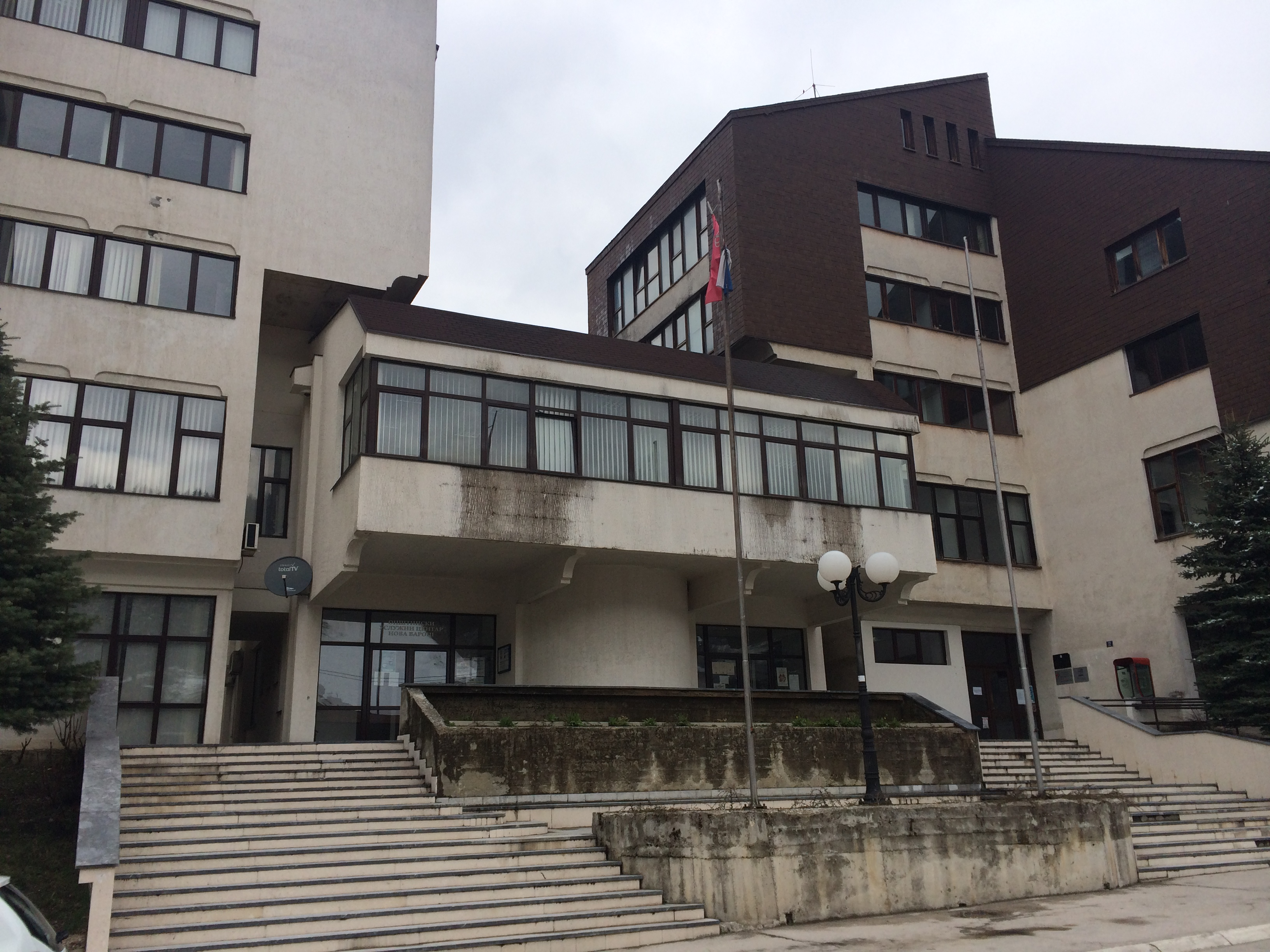
Town Hall

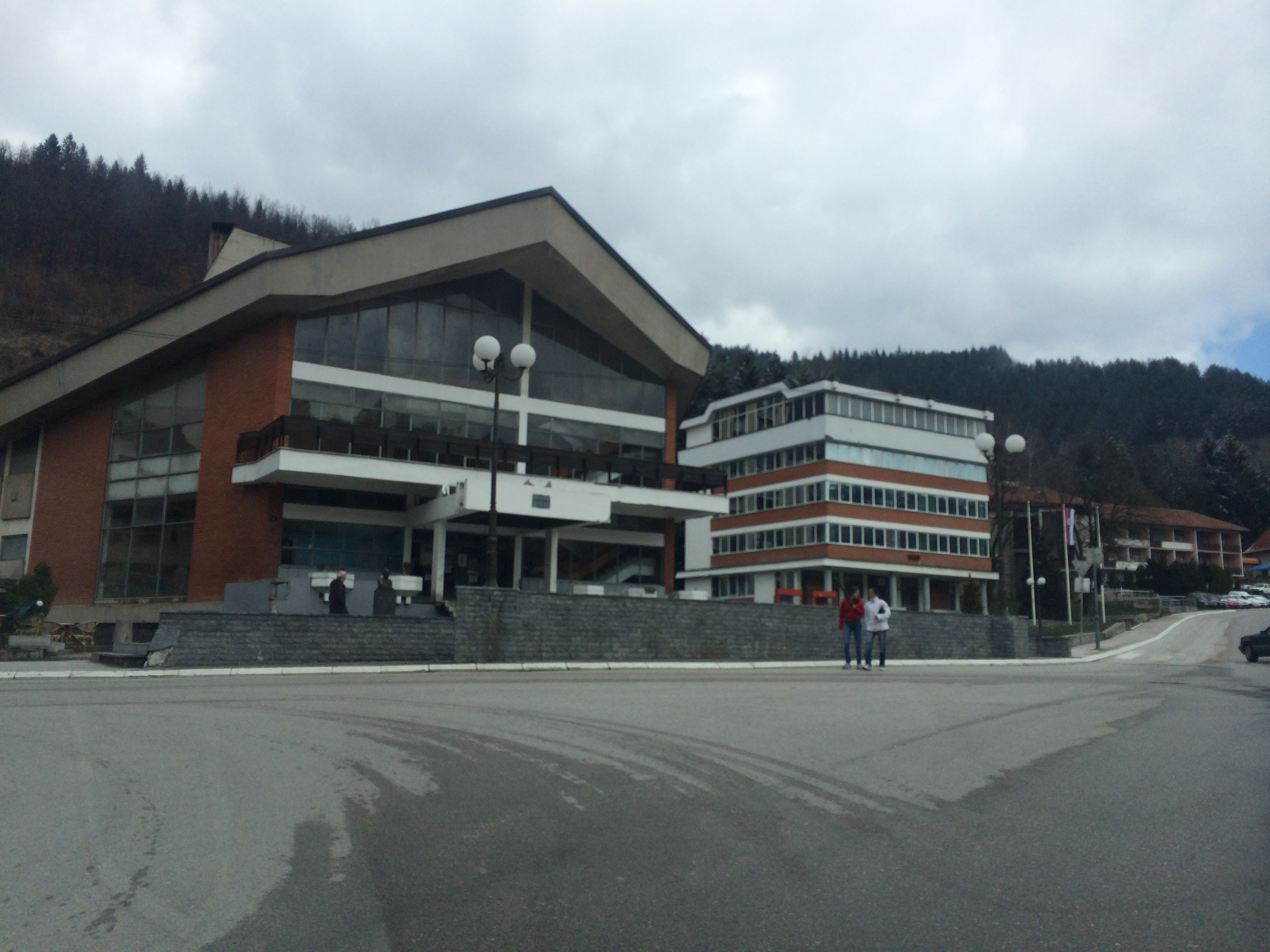
Nova Varoš Cultural Center

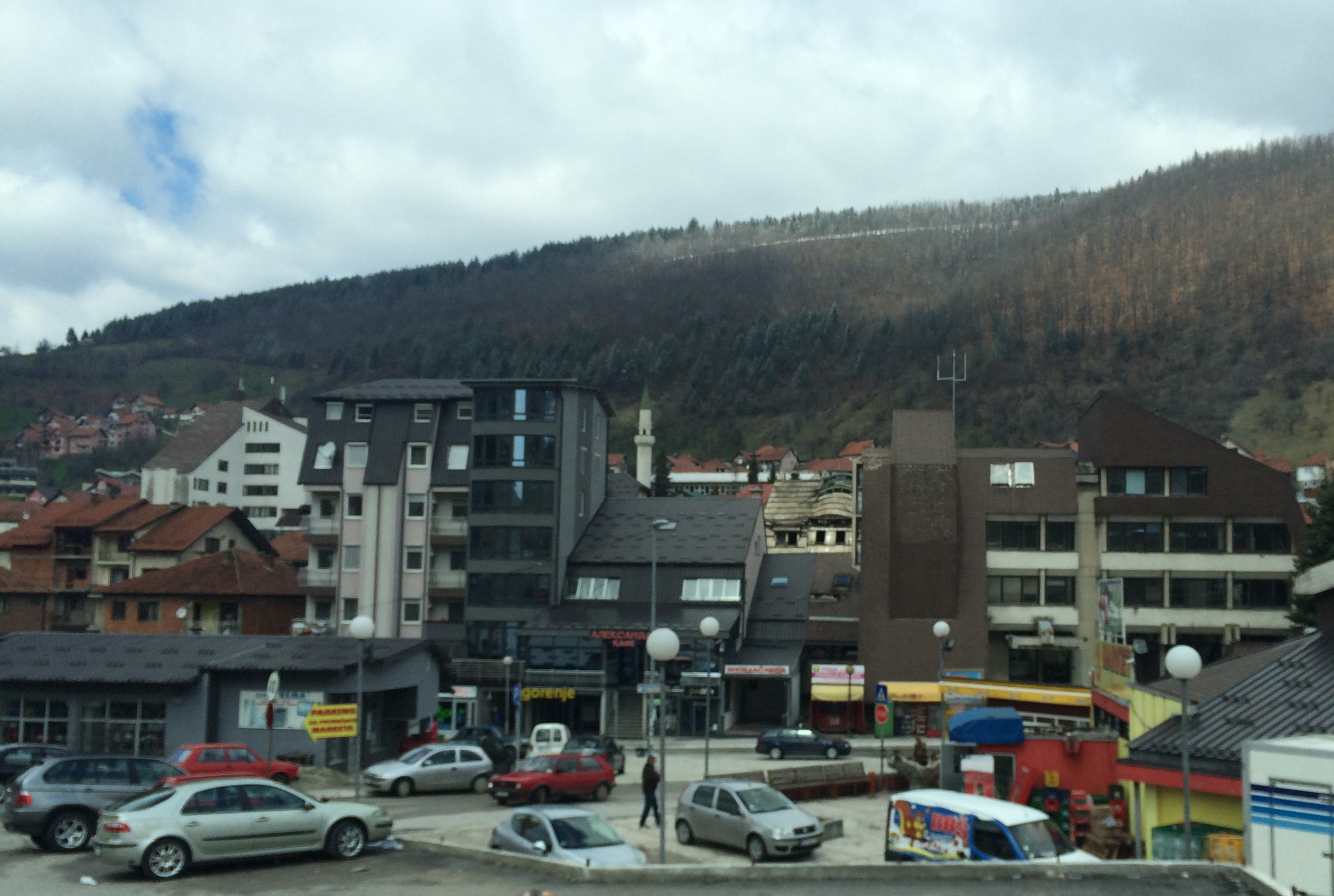
Town center

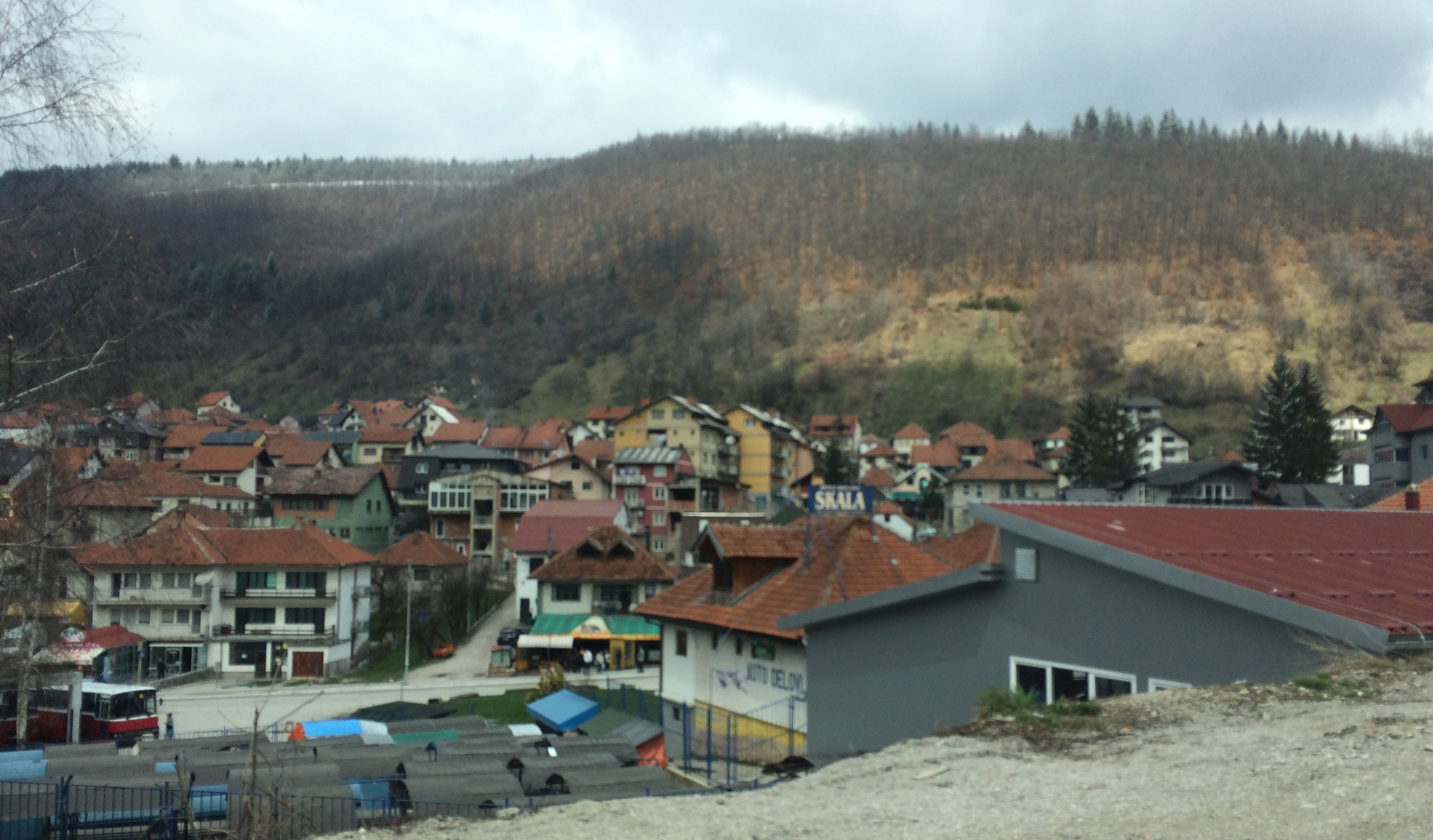
Town buildings

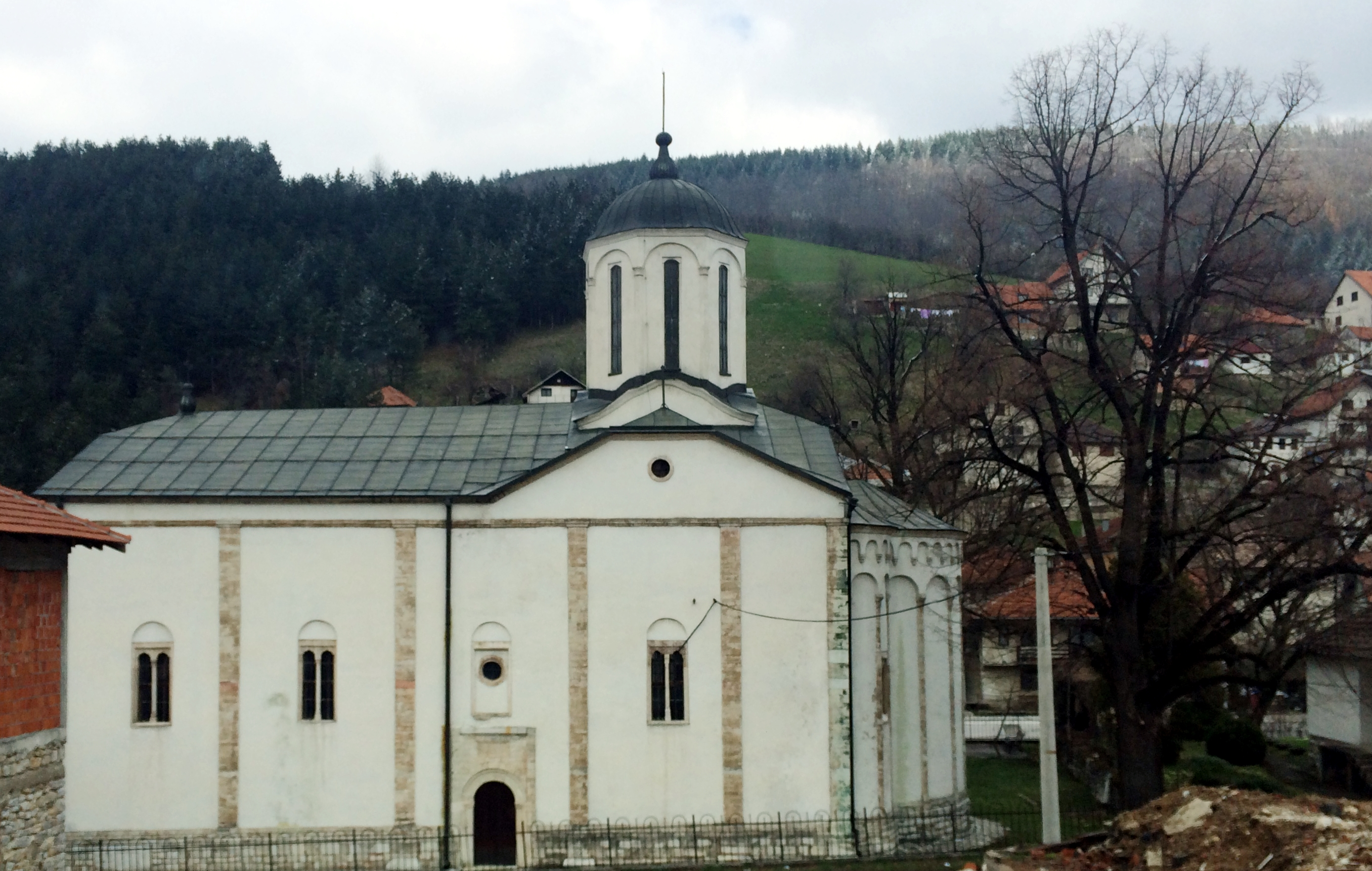
Orthodox Church

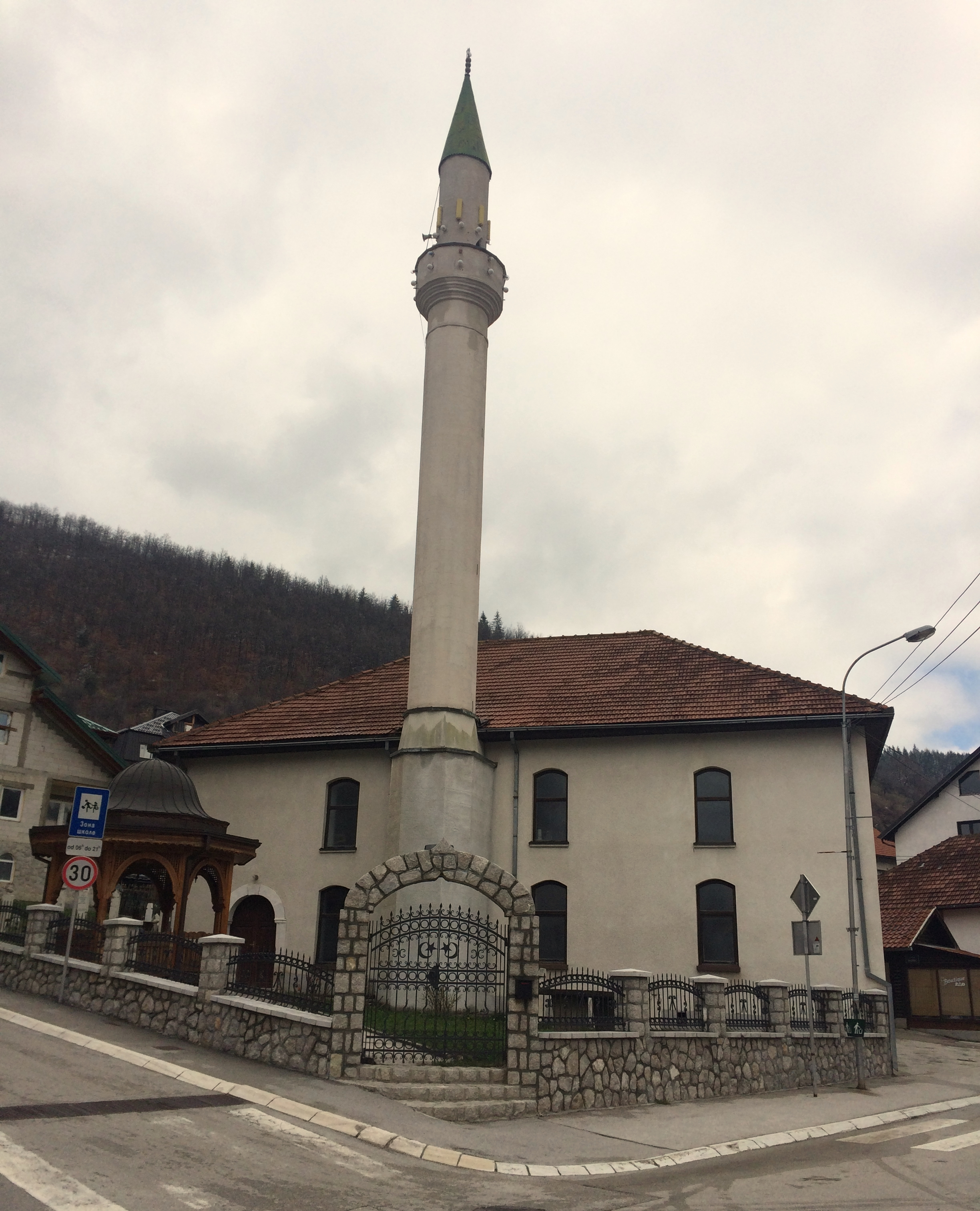
Nova Varoš Mosque

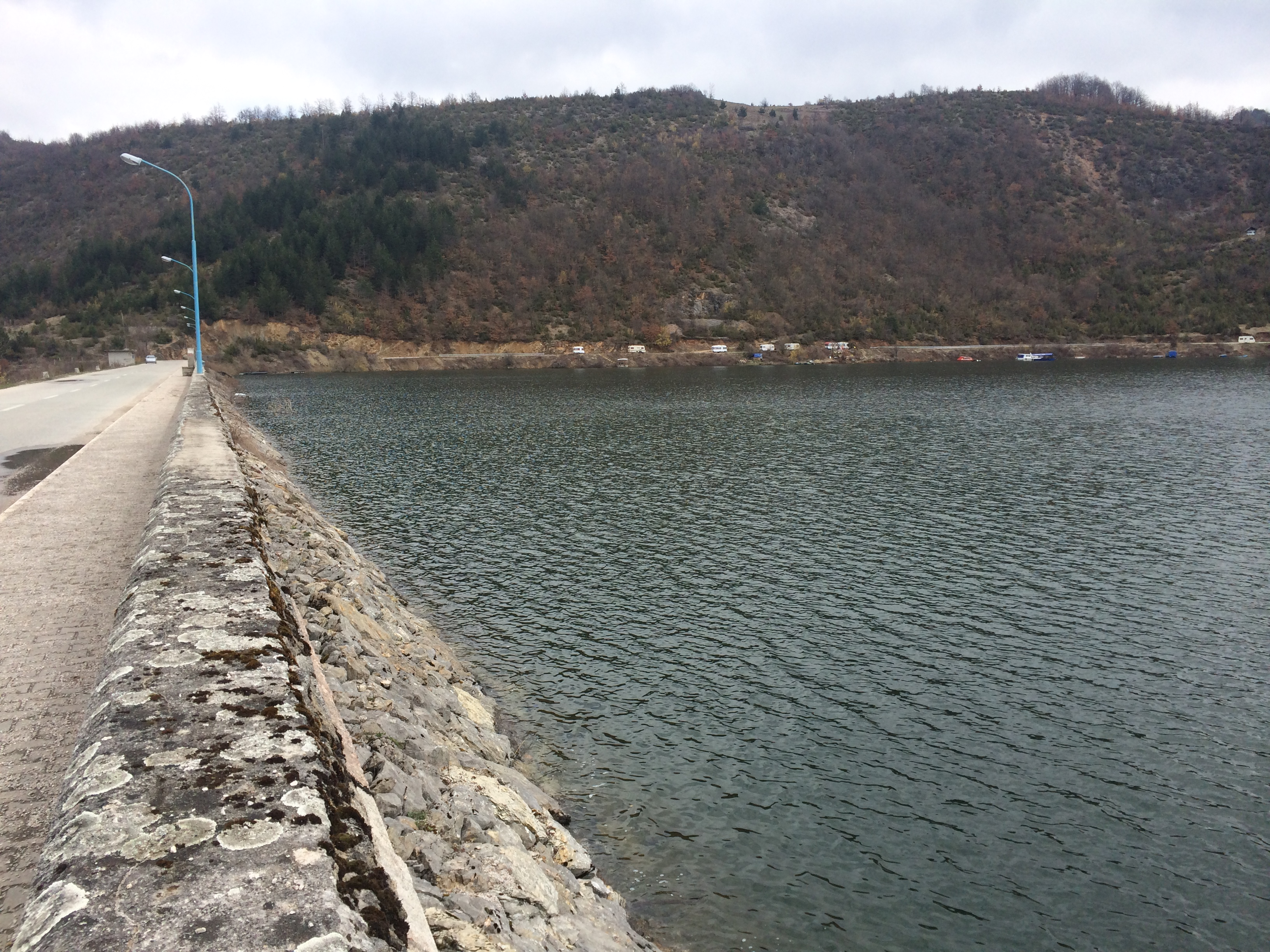
Uvac Lake

== Notable people ==
- Gavrilo I, Serbian Patriarch
- Petar Bojović, military commander and field marshal
- Ljubinko Drulović, former footballer, 2013 European U19 Championship winning manager
- Nemanja Nedović, basketball player, silver medalist at the 2016 Summer Olympics
- Vladimir Otašević, footballer
- Bojana Lečić, 2011 Miss Serbia
- Ivan Šaponjić, footballer

== See also ==
- List of places in Serbia
- Sandžak
