= Tisovica (Nova Varoš) =

- Village
- Location within Serbia
- Coordinates: 43°27′N 20°01′E
- Country: Serbia
- District: Zlatibor District
- Municipality: Nova Varoš

Population (2002)
  - Total: 117
- Time zone: UTC+1 (CET)
  - Summer (DST): UTC+2 (CEST)

Tisovica is a village in the municipality of Nova Varoš, eastern Sandzak. According to the 2002 census, the village has a population of 117 people.
