= Brdo (Nova Varoš) =

Brdo Брдо
- Village
- Location within Serbia
- Coordinates: 43°27′N 19°49′E
- Country: Serbia
- Municipality: Nova Varoš
- Time zone: UTC+1 (CET)
  - Summer (DST): UTC+2 (CEST)

Brdo is a village situated in Nova Varoš municipality in Serbia.
