= Church of St. Nicholas, Brezova =

Church in Moravica District, Serbia

Saint Nicholas' Church Црква Светог Николе Crkva Svetog Nikole
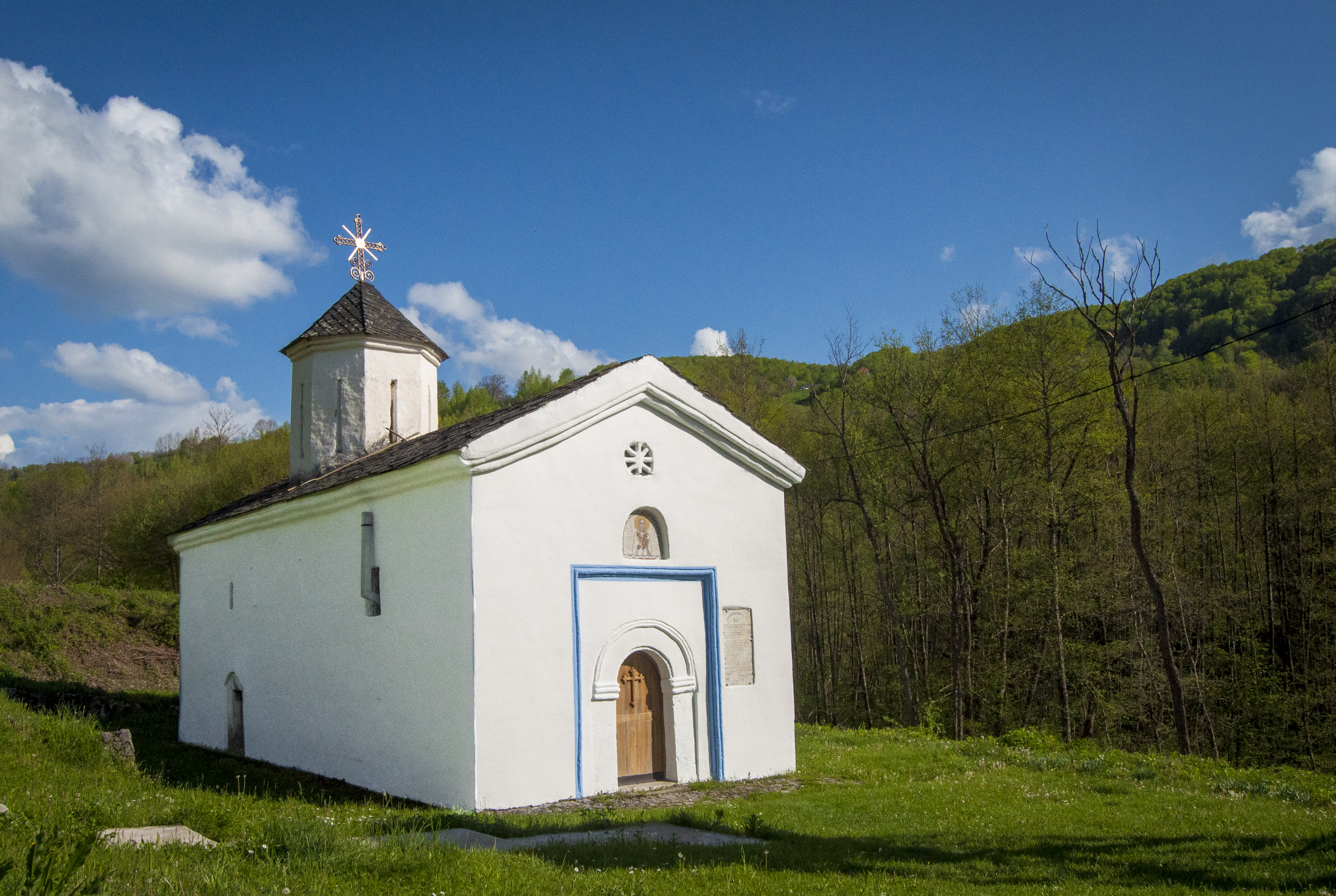

Religion
- Affiliation: Serbian Orthodox
- Leadership: Institute for Cultural Heritage Preservation Kraljevo
- Year consecrated: first half of the 17th century

Location
- Location: Brezova, Ivanjica, Serbia
- Interactive map of Saint Nicholas' Church; Црква Светог Николе; Crkva Svetog Nikole
- Coordinates: 43°32′42″N 20°04′13″E

Architecture
- Type: Serbo-Byzantine

The Church of Saint Nicholas (Serbian: Црква Светог Николе/Crkva Svetog Nikole) is a church of the Serbian Orthodox Church, located in the village of Brezova, 26 km southwest of Ivanjica. Situated on Mučanj mountain, it was built during the first half of the 17th century at the place of an older church. Folk tradition links the construction of the church with Despot Stefan Lazarević whose fresco portrait is located in the church, although he lived in the 15th century.

An Archeological survey of the church, but also its conservation and restoration was being conducted at several instances (1971–1972, 1973–1975. and 1987), resulting in church's present status of state protected monument of great cultural significance.

== Architecture ==
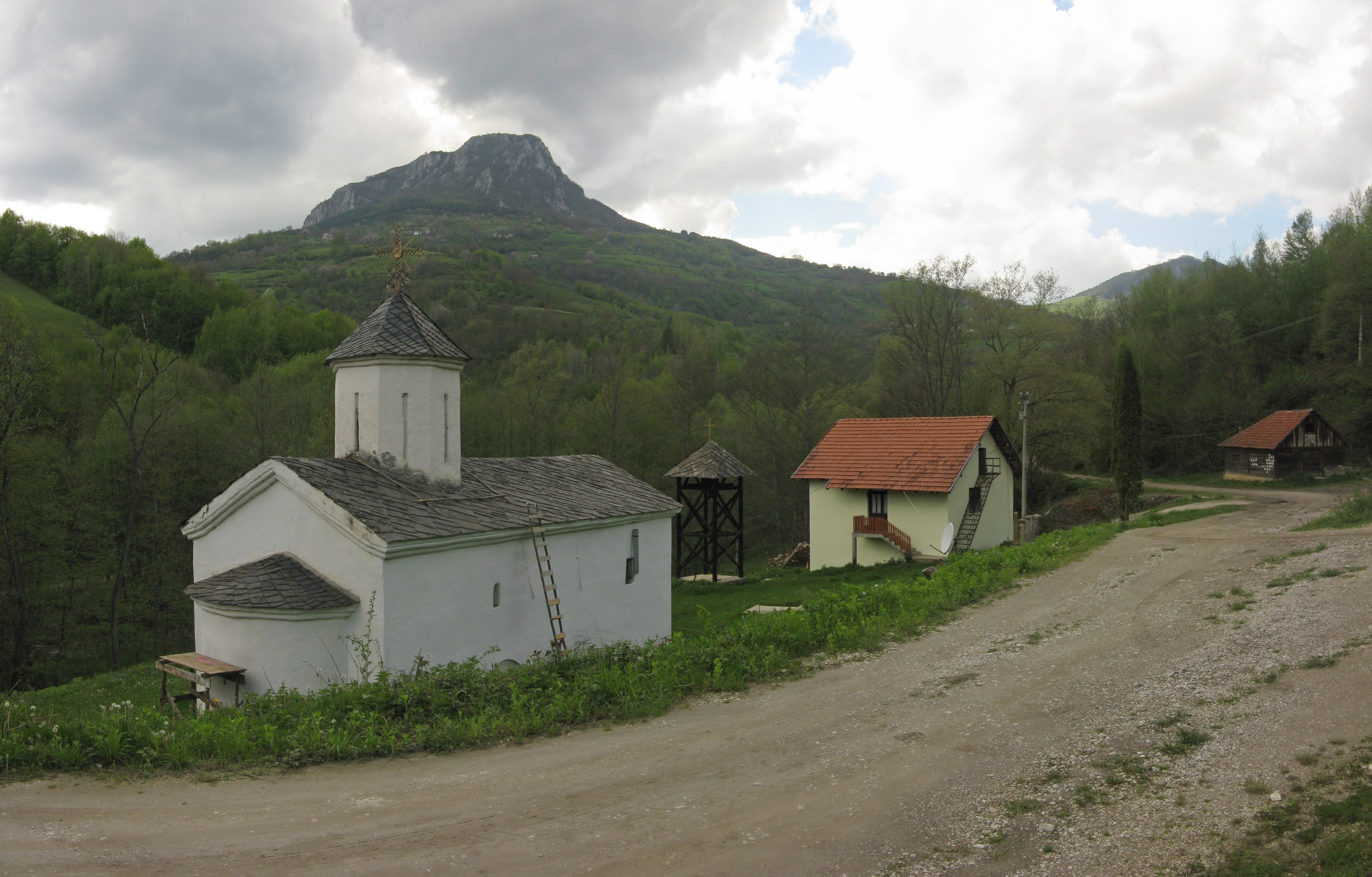
The church with the Mt. Mučanj in the distance

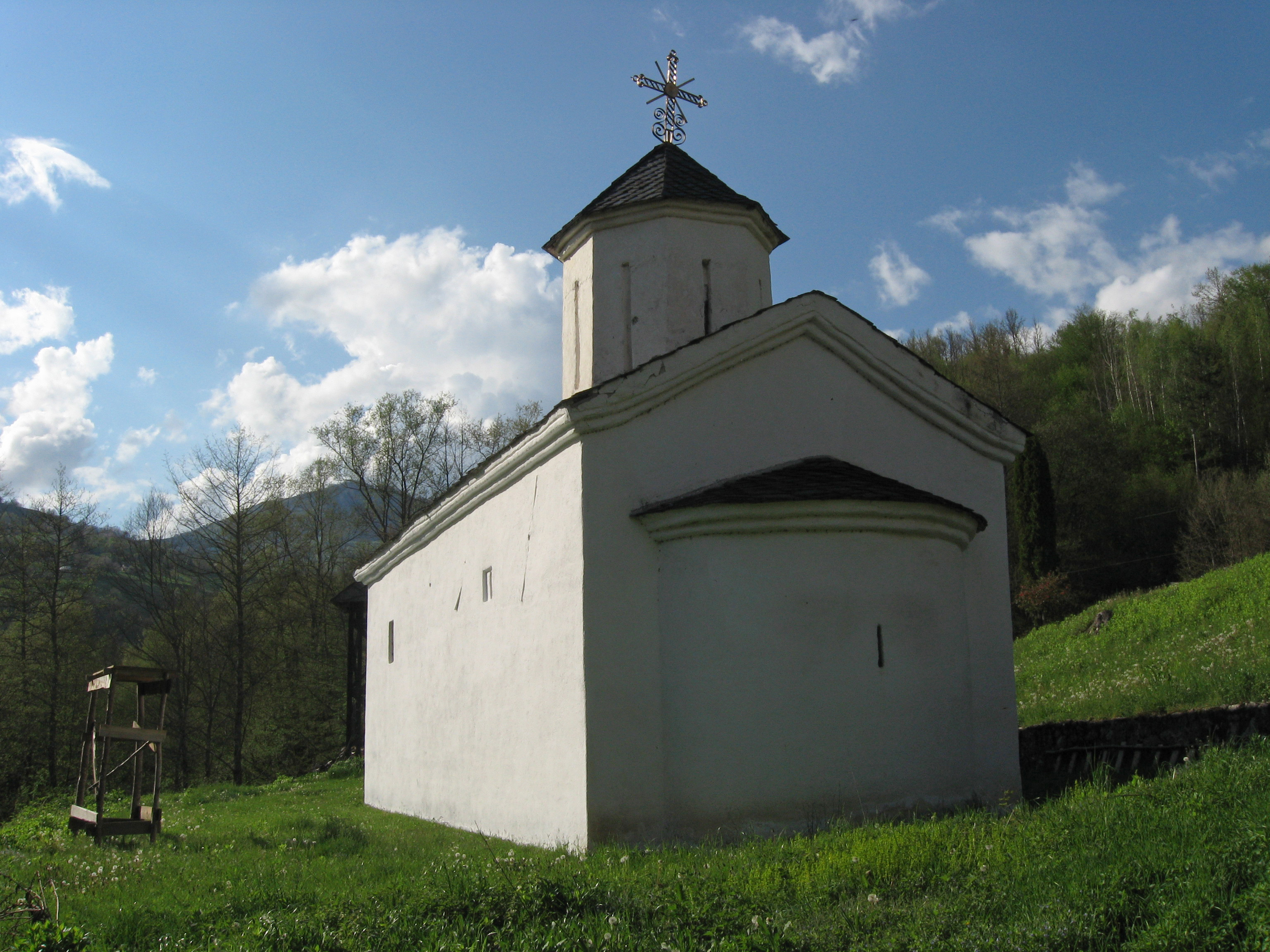
Southeastern side of the church

Saint Nicholas' Church in Brezova is a single-nave building with polygonal dome and backside rose windows. The church's cella is divided into three aisles. The dome is raised over the middle aisle, while the side aisles are topped with barrel vaults. The altar apse has a semi-cylindrical shape. Large narthex and the second (north-side) entrance were built subsequently. The Iconostasis of the older church dating from the 14th century is preserved in the Saint Nicholas' Church.

Primarily because of its plan, but also because of other architectural features, the church is classified in the group of Serbian churches built during the period of Ottoman rule over Serbia and influenced by the old Raška architectural school.

== Frescoes ==
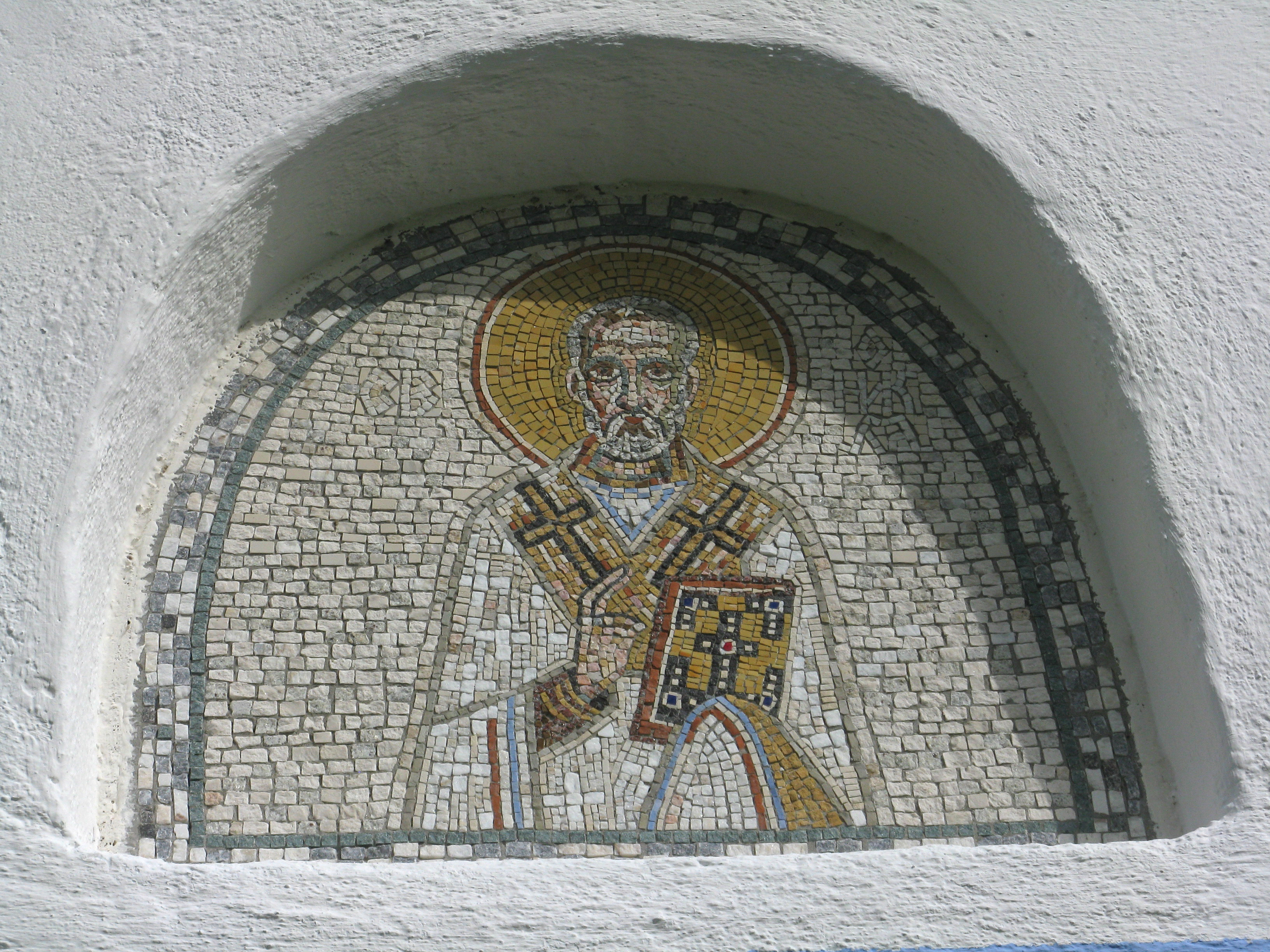
Mosaic of St Nicholas at the entrance to the church

The church's frescos were being painted during the 1730s by two painters of "entirely different education, talent and artistic styles" who "failed to accomplish harmonic unity", but their paintings have "exceptionally interesting iconography". The decoration of the greater part of the church was conducted by the less talented of the two, an apprentice of priest Strahinja from Budimlje. The frescos of the second painter are "characterized by the affinity to icon-painting, the elegance of elongated figures and color modeling".

The frescos are dominated by scenes from the life of Saint Nicholas and portraits of Car Lazar of Serbia, Carica Milica and despot Stefan Lazarević. The portrait of despot, placed on a northern wall near the north-west corner of the church, is considered to have been made after an authentic fresco, which had probably been painted between 1421. and 1427, during the despot Stefan's rule. Next to the despot's portrait, on the western wall, stands the portrait of his father, Lazar of Serbia.

Painter Simeon Lazović made the imperial portal and doorway with Nedraman's eye in 1805, as a part of the church's iconostasis.

== Gallery ==
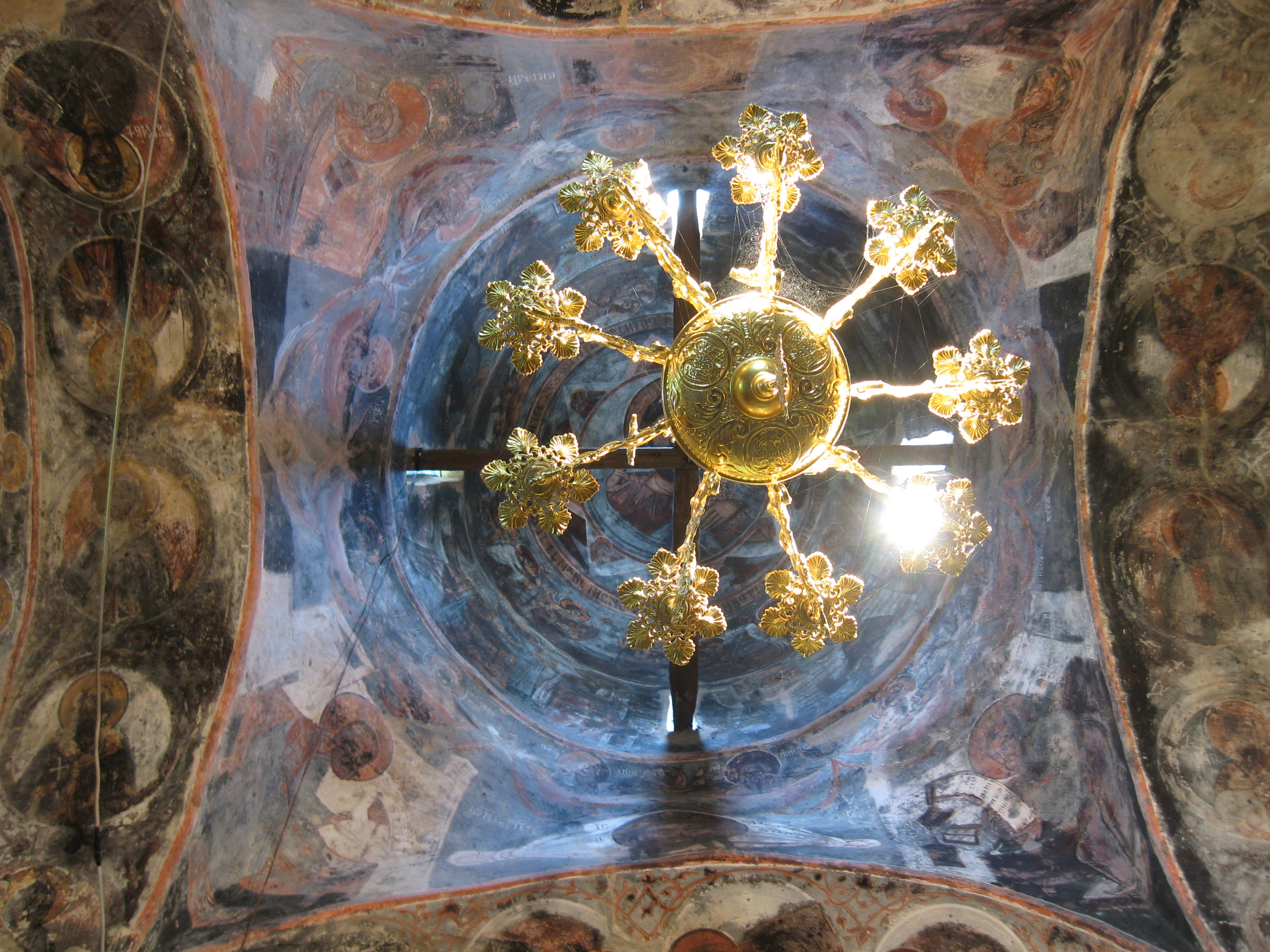
The chandelier and the frescos

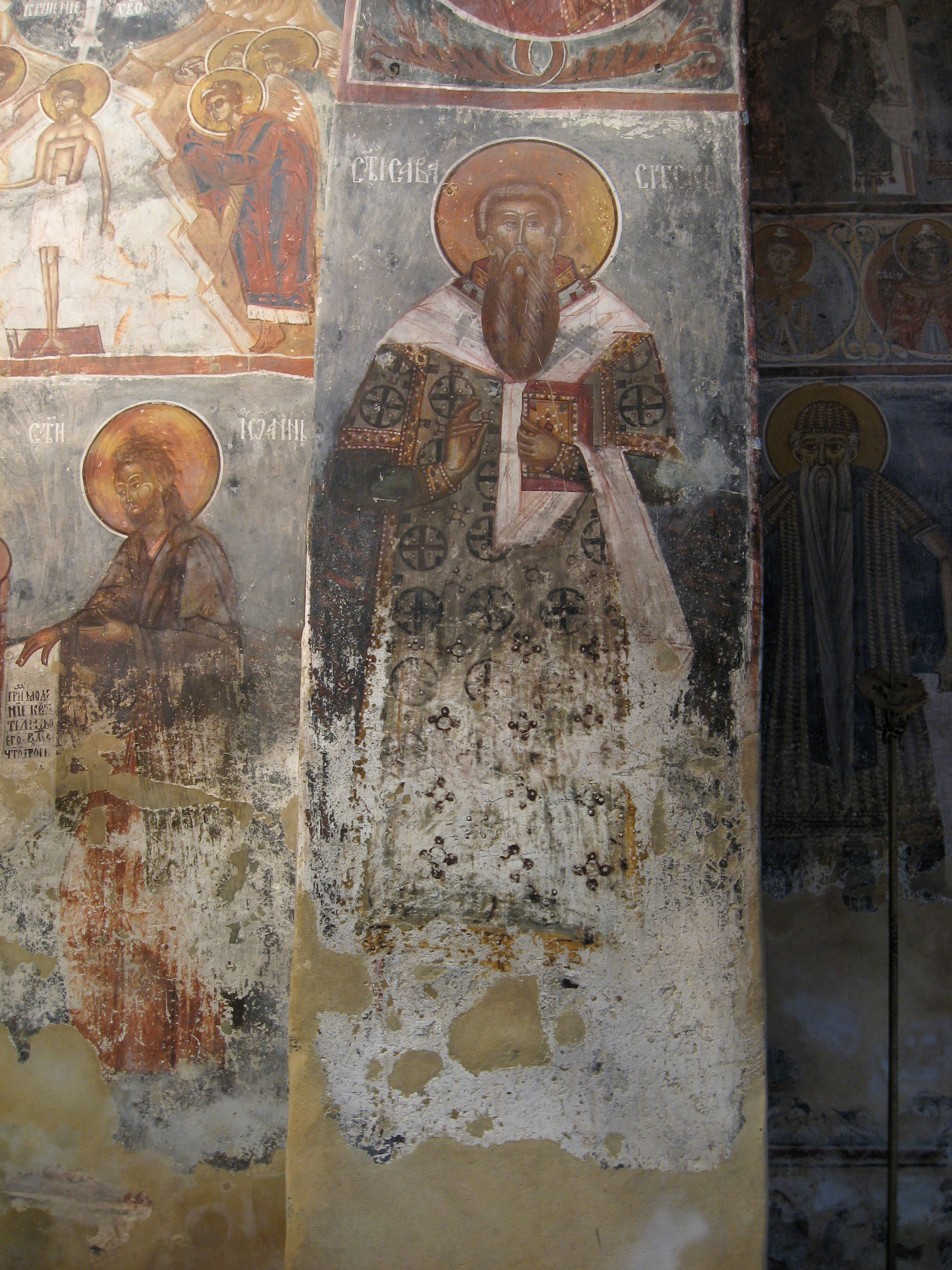
The frescos on the south wall

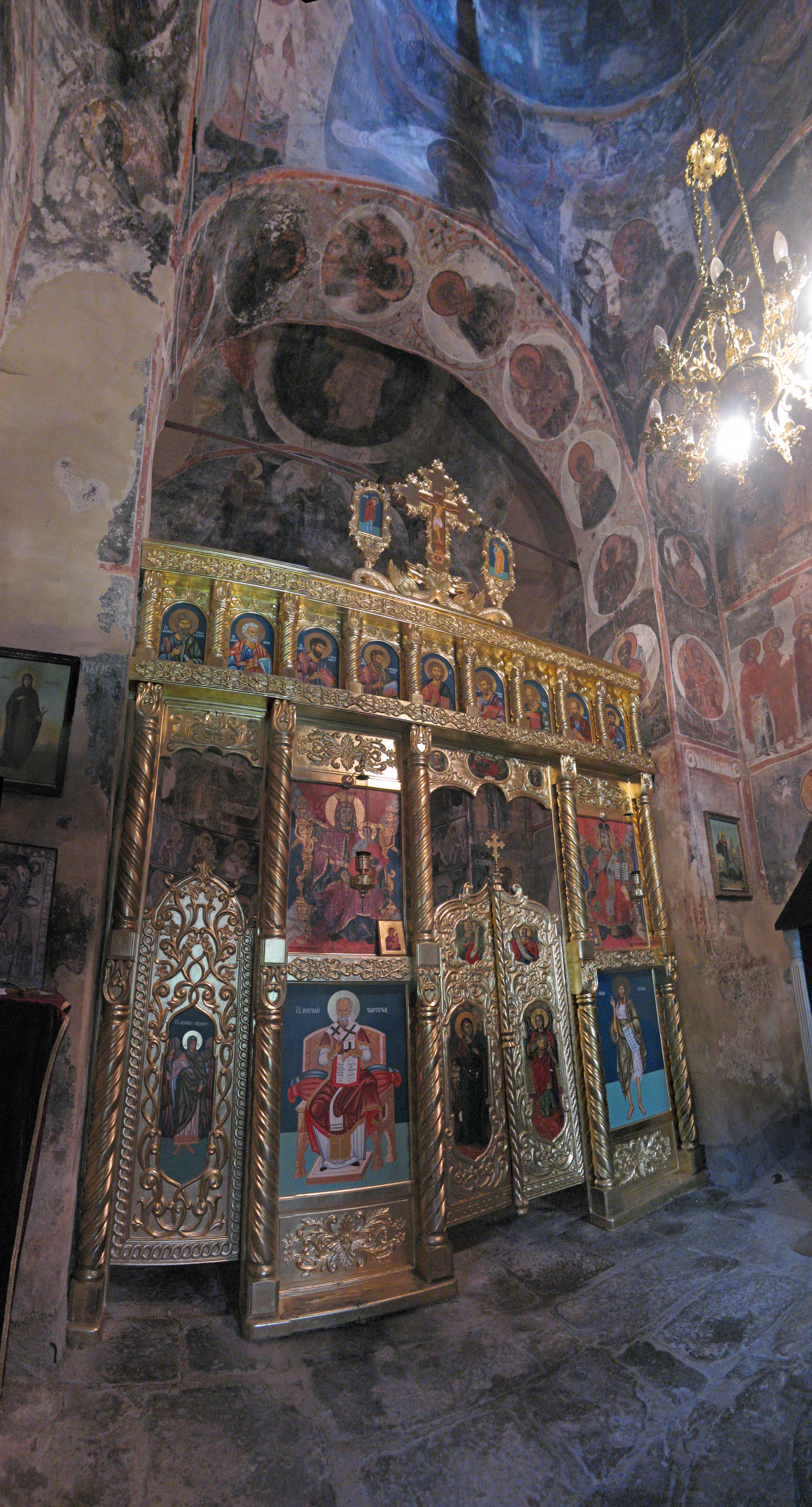
The iconostasis

== See also ==
- Ivanjica
- Stefan Lazarević

== Notes and references ==
Notes

- Monuments of Culture in Serbia: "Crkva svetog Nikole" (SANU) (in Serbian and English)
- Zavod za zaštitu spomenika Kraljevo
- Radojčić, Svetozar (1996). Portreti srpskih vladara u srednjem veku (fototipsko izdanje originala iz 1934. godine sa dopunama). Belgrade. ISBN 86-80879-07-X.
