= Draževići, Serbia =

Draževići Дражевићи
- Village
- Location within Serbia
- Coordinates: 43°27′N 19°45′E
- Country: Serbia
- Municipality: Nova Varoš
- Time zone: UTC+1 (CET)
  - Summer (DST): UTC+2 (CEST)

Draževići immediately west of Nova Varos, southwestern Serbia

Draževići is a village situated in Nova Varoš municipality in Serbia.
