= Radoinja =

- Village
- Location within Serbia
- Coordinates: 43°30′N 19°45′E
- Country: Serbia
- District: Zlatibor District
- Municipality: Nova Varoš

Population (2002)
  - Total: 690
- Time zone: UTC+1 (CET)
  - Summer (DST): UTC+2 (CEST)

Radoinja is a village in the municipality of Nova Varoš, western Serbia. According to the 2002 census, the village has a population of 690 people. During the Second World War there was a partisan hospital there, organised initially by Judita Alargić.
