= Seništa =

- Village
- Location within Serbia
- Coordinates: 43°32′N 19°45′E
- Country: Serbia
- District: Zlatibor District
- Municipality: Nova Varoš

Population (2002)
  - Total: 262
- Time zone: UTC+1 (CET)
  - Summer (DST): UTC+2 (CEST)

Seništa is a village in the municipality of Nova Varoš, western Serbia. According to the 2002 census, the village has a population of 262 people.

Notable members of Selaković family, such as Nikola Selaković and Marko Selakovic, originate from Seništa.
