= Ivan Kovalčik Mileševac =

Serbian artist

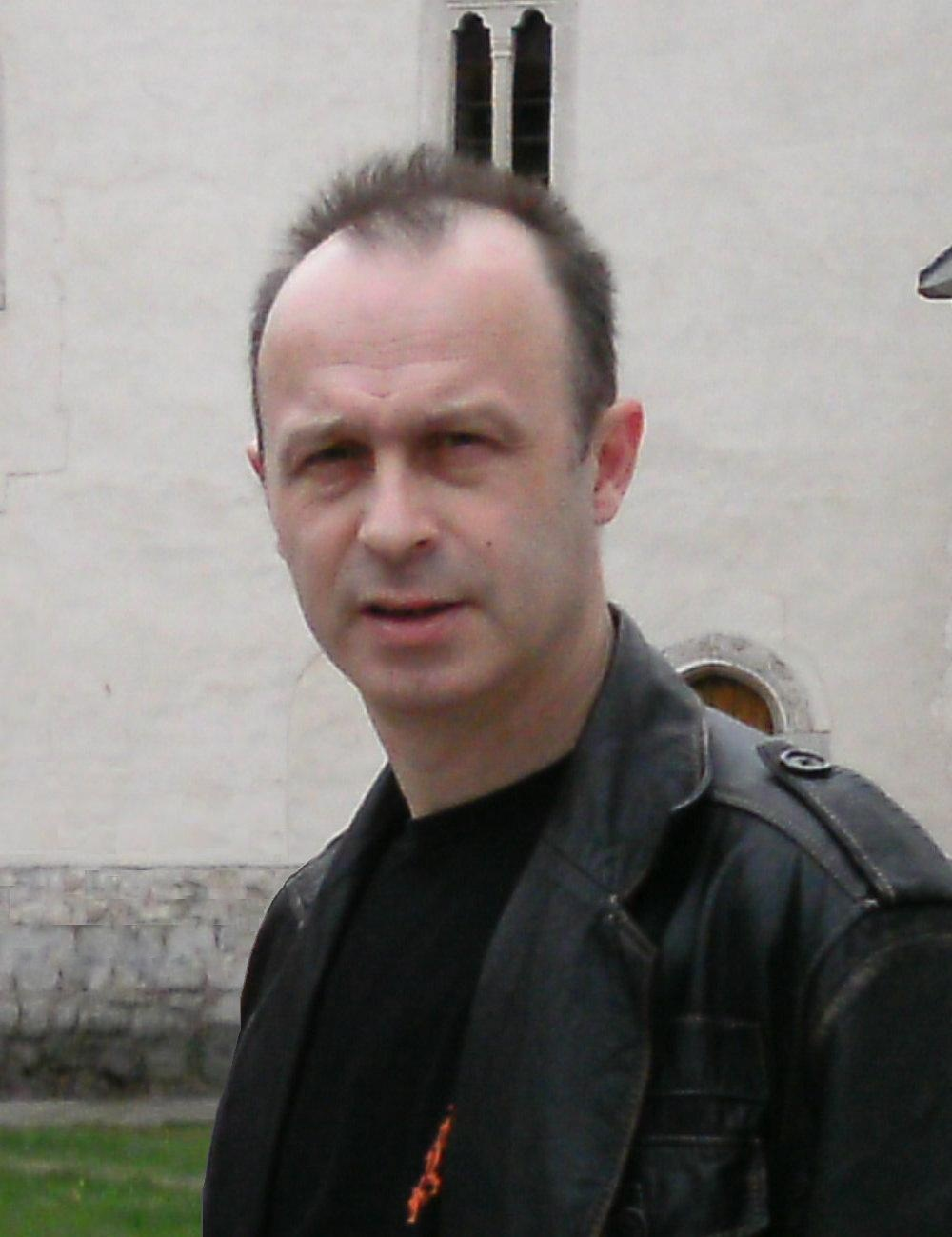
- Iconographer and painter
- Born: March 3, 1968 (age 58); Prijepolje, Serbia
- Known for: Painting
- Movement: Christian iconography

Ivan Kovalčik Mileševac (Serbian Cyrillic: Иван Ковалчик Милешевац; March 3, 1968 – March 30, 2017) was a Serbian icon and fresco painter – the Prime Master of the Serbian Orthodox Eparchy of Mileševa. He was born in Prijepolje, Yugoslavia, Serbia. At the initiative of the National Museums of Prijepolje and Belgrade headed by directors Slavoljub Pušica and Jefta Jeftović in reconstruction projects of Nemanjic's endowments, in collaboration with SANU and under the supervision of the Institute for Protection of Cultural Heritage of Kraljevo, with the blessing of Serbian Patriarch Pavle and by blessing of episcops (bishops) of the Eparchy (dioceses) of Mileševa, Vasilije Veinović and Filaret Mićević, painted a larger number of iconostasis for the Serbian Orthodox Church in churches and monasteries of the Eparchy of Mileševa. In 2006 he relocated to Novi Sad, where within the rules of Church painting, he created icons and frescoes in the Byzantine style.

== Significant projects ==
in the Eparchy of Mileševa:

- 1998 - Iconostasis for Monastery Davidovica, dedicated to the Baptism of the Lord - 13th century
- 2002 - Iconostasis for Monastery Kumanica, dedicated to St. Archangel Gavrilo - 14th century
- 2005 - Iconostasis for Monastery Dubnica, dedicated to the Holy Trinity - 14th century
- 2012 - Iconostasis for Monastery Janja, devoted to the Righteous Joachim and Anne - 15th century

== Works ==
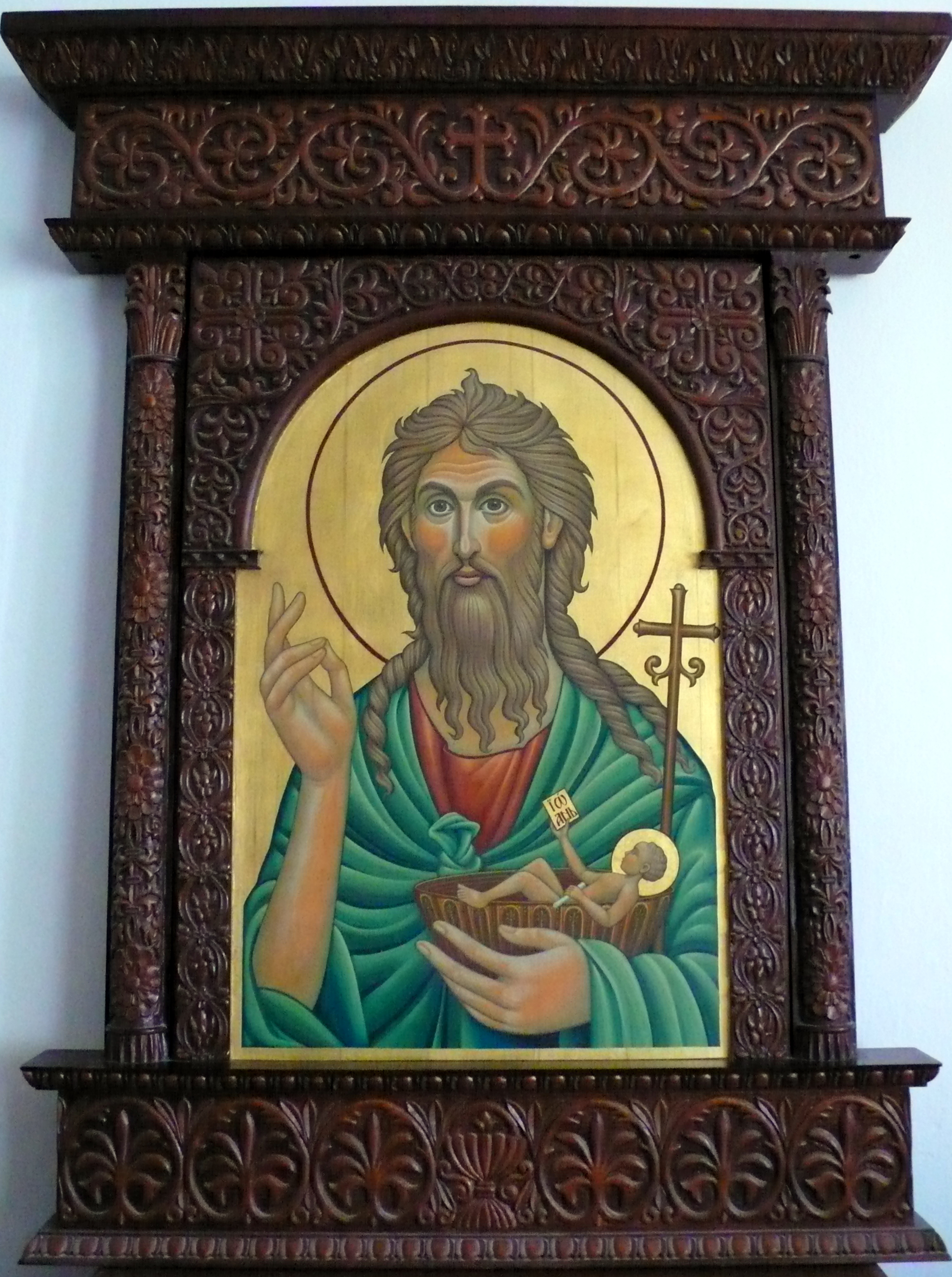
St.John the Baptist-Birth, author work-unique, egg tempera on wood, 103,5x83 cm, 2001.

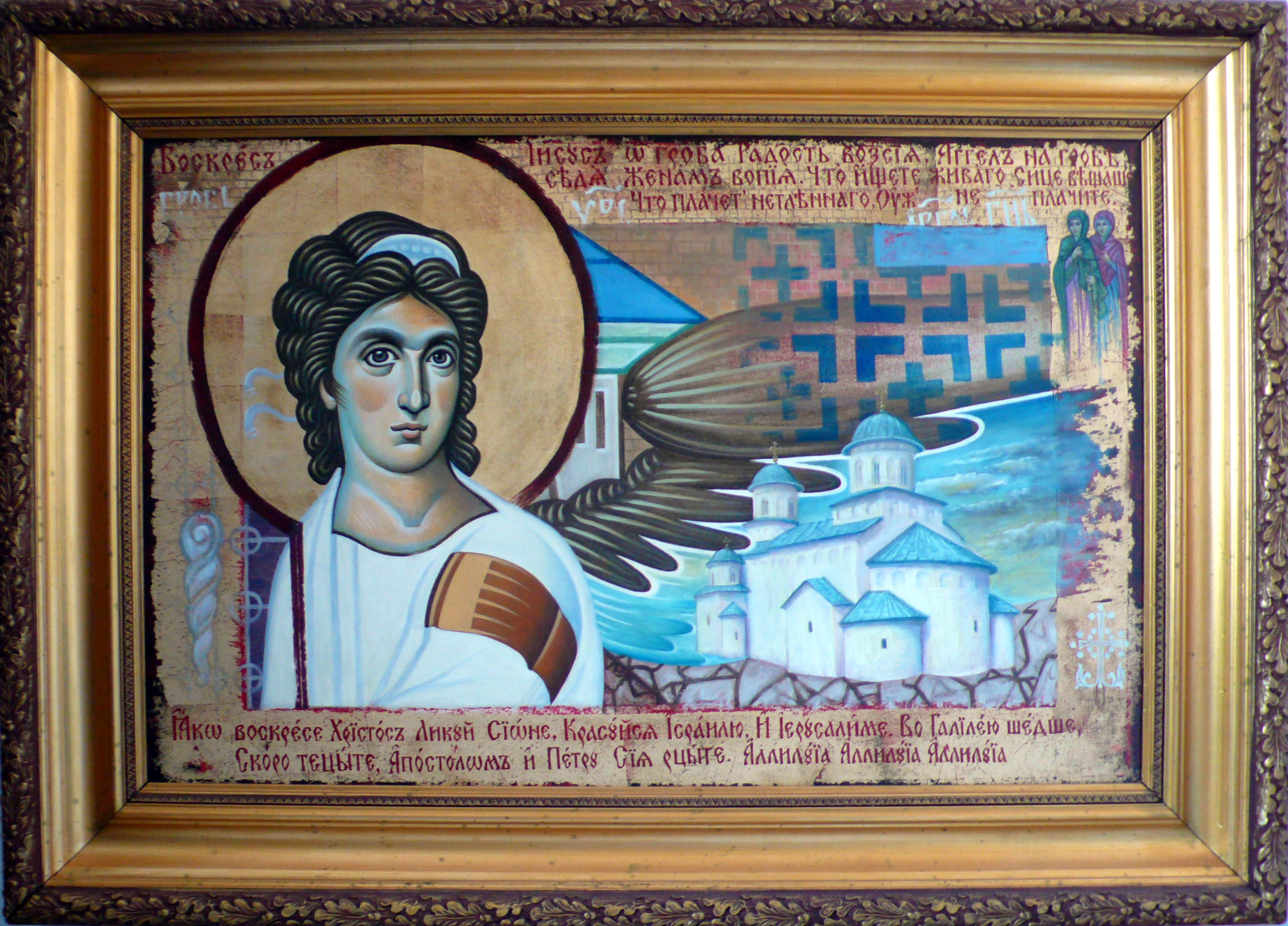
White Angel-Resurrection, author work-unique, oil on canvas,40x60cm(53x74), 2013.

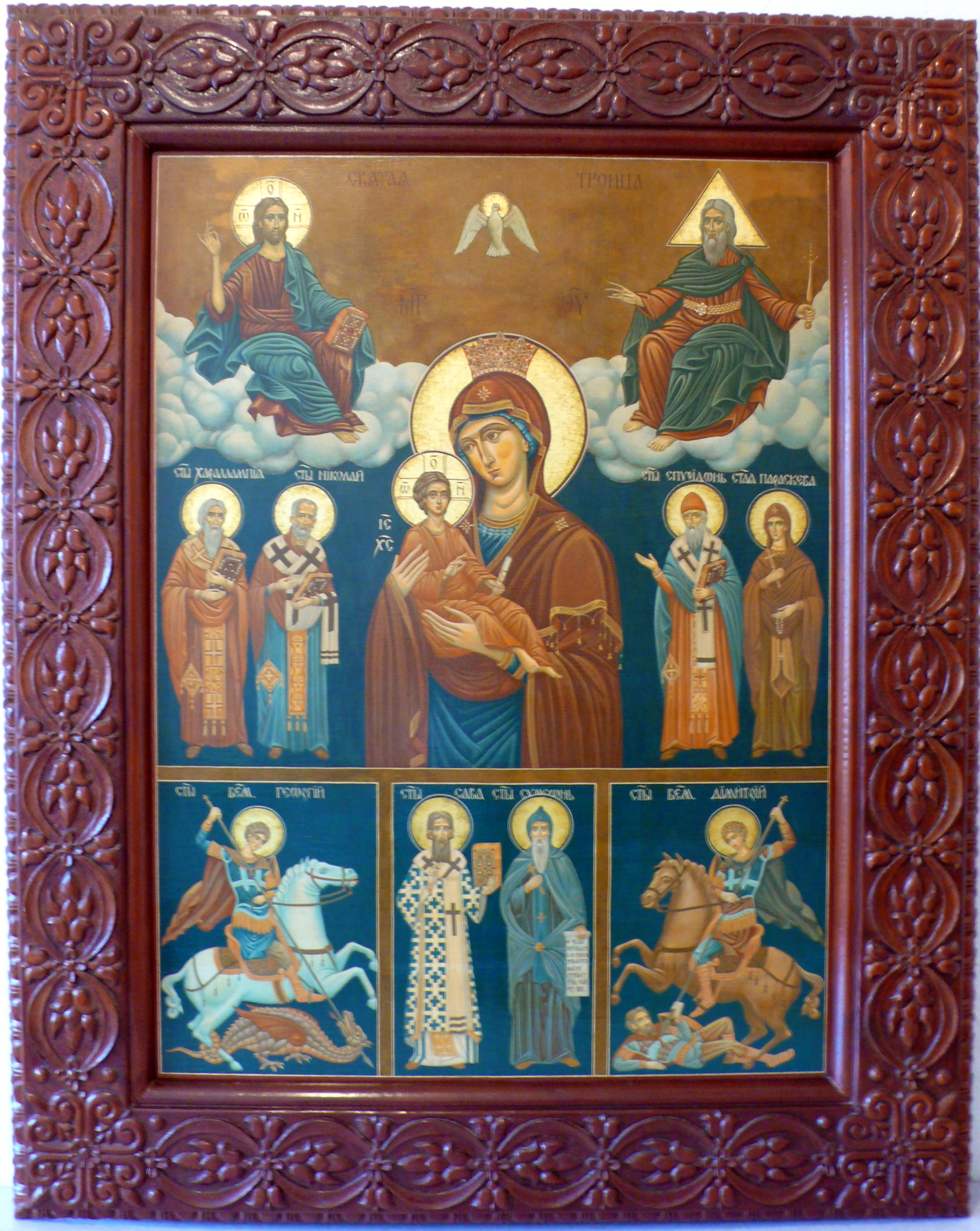
Queen of Heaven, author work-unique, egg tempera on wood panel 80x59cm, hand-carved maple frame 102x82cm, 1998.
