= Savina Monastery (Montenegro) =

Serbian Orthodox monastery in Herceg Novi, Montenegro

Coordinates: 42°27′12″N 18°33′18″E

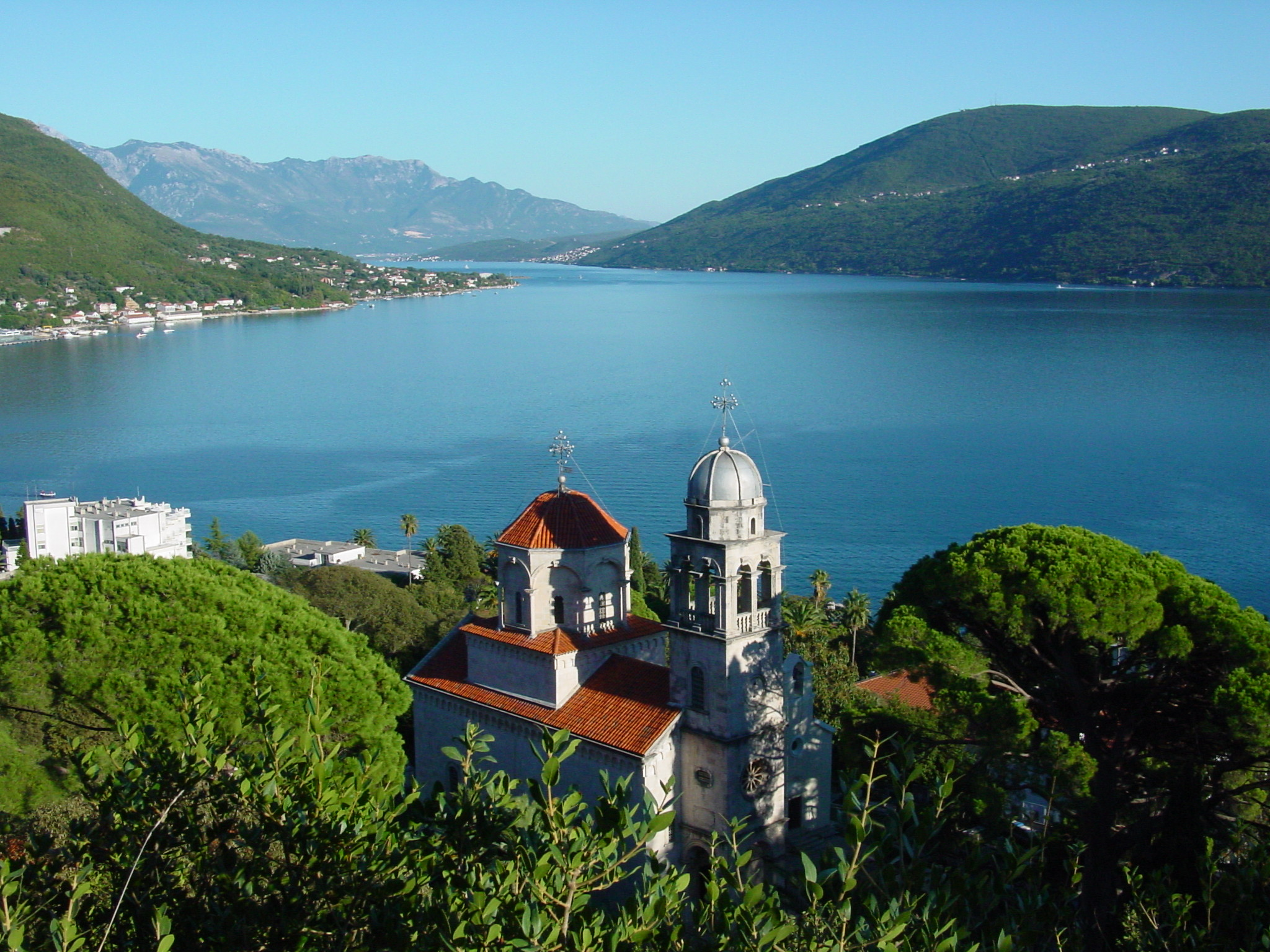
- Interactive map of Savina Monastery

Monastery information
- Denomination: Serbian Orthodox Church
- Established: 15th century
- Diocese: Metropolitanate of Montenegro and the Littoral

Site
- Location: Herceg Novi
- Country: Montenegro

The Savina Monastery (Serbian: Манастир Савина, romanized: Manastir Savina; lit. "Sava's monastery") is a Serbian Orthodox monastery in Herceg Novi, Montenegro.

== History ==
The Small Church of the Dormition of the Theotokos is traditionally dated to 1030 according to an inscription added in 1831, although stylistic analysis suggests it more likely dates to the 15th century during the rule of the Kosača noble family. Several layers of fresco painting have been discovered inside; the oldest, beneath a layer dated 1565, is believed to originate from the mid-15th century and shows stylistic similarities to the work of Lovro Dobričević. The iconostasis consists of elements from different periods; the Royal Doors and a large crucifix were made in 1703 by the artist Dimitrije Daskal, while the main icon of the Dormition was painted by his son Rafailo. The Great Church of the Dormition of the Theotokos was built between 1777 and 1799 by the master builder Nikola Foretić from Korčula. The architecture combines Byzantine, Roman-Greek, and Baroque elements, reflecting the historical meeting of Eastern and Western artistic traditions in the region of Bay of Kotor. Its iconostasis, created in 1795 by the icon painter Simeon Lazović with the help of his son Aleksije, similarly blends traditional Orthodox iconography with Baroque stylistic influences. The church has no single patron; historical records show that it was built through donations and support from the local population. Throughout its history, the monastery served as an important cultural and educational center for the surrounding community. A school operated there for many years and was attended by several individuals who later became notable figures. On Đurđevdan (St. George's Day) in 2005, director Emir Kusturica was baptised in the monastery as Nemanja Kusturica.

== Architecture ==
The Small Church of the Dormition of the Theotokos is 10m high and 6m wide. Its foundation dates to 1030, although the oldest record of it is from 1648. Its reconstruction began in the late 17th century, with the arrival of refugee monks from Tvrdoš Monastery in Herzegovina, and it was completed in 1831. The Great Church of the Dormition of the Theotokos was built between the 1777 and 1799, and builder was a master Nikola Foretić from the island of Korčula. The Church of Saint Sava, built by Saint Sava, is located outside the monastery complex.

== Relics ==
The monastery has a large number of relics originating from the time of the Nemanjić dynasty (relics of Empress Jelena, cross of Saint Sava), including those transferred from Tvrdoš Monastery.

The iconostasis of the church was done by Simeon Lazović and it represents a unique work of Serb Baroque art.

== See also ==
- List of Serbian monasteries
