= Kućani =

- Village
- Location within Serbia
- Coordinates: 43°32′N 19°51′E
- Country: Serbia
- District: Zlatibor District
- Municipality: Nova Varoš
- 256
- Time zone: UTC+1 (CET)
  - Summer (DST): UTC+2 (CEST)

Kućani (Serbian: Кућани) is a village in the municipality of Nova Varoš, western Serbia. According to the 2002 census, the village has a population of 256 people.
