= Štitkovo =

- Village
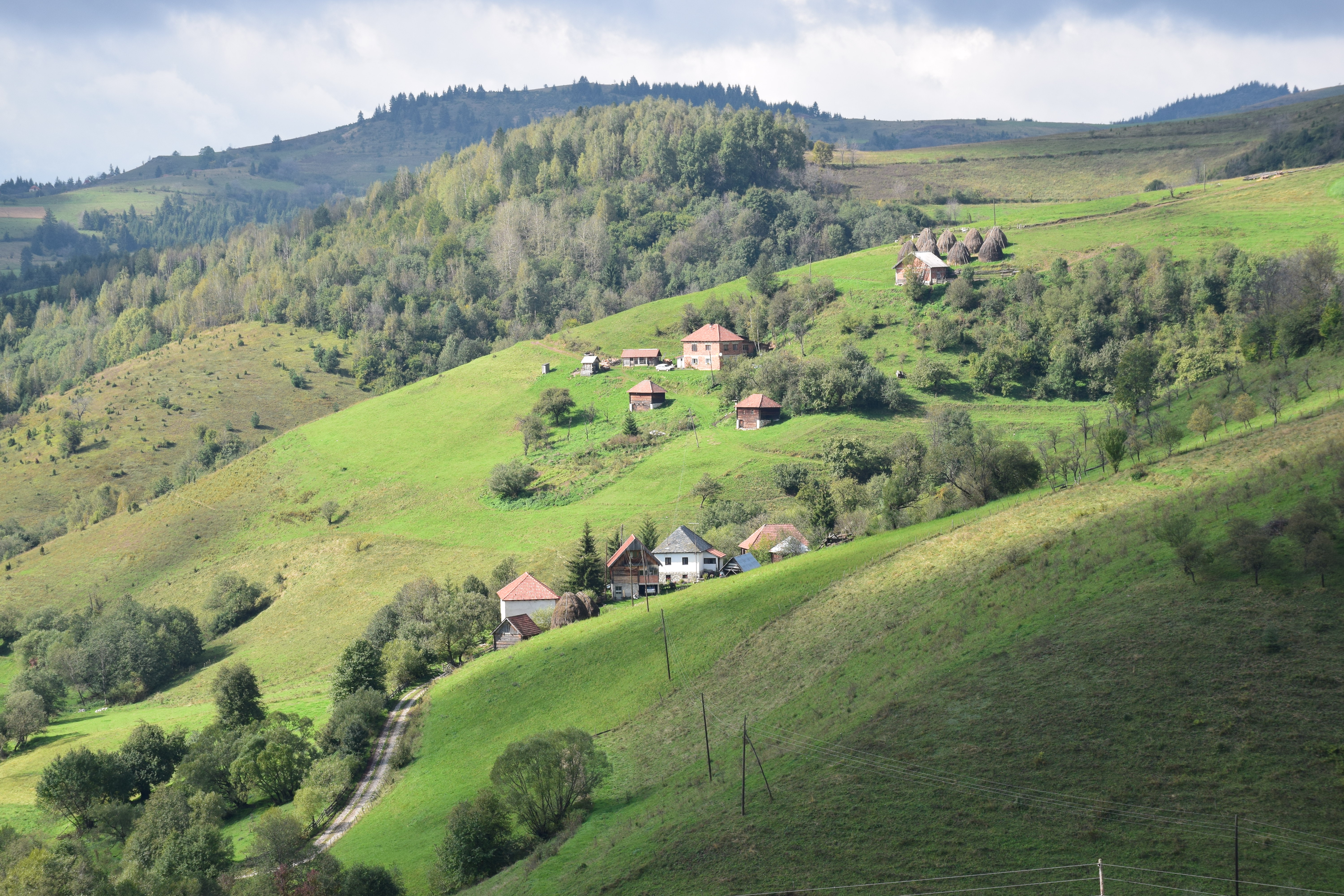

- Location within Serbia
- Coordinates: 43°29′N 19°59′E
- Country: Serbia
- District: Zlatibor District
- Municipality: Nova Varoš

Population (2002)
  - Total: 130
- Time zone: UTC+1 (CET)
  - Summer (DST): UTC+2 (CEST)

Štitkovo is a village in the municipality of Nova Varoš, western Serbia. At the 2002 census, the village had a population of 130 people.

The village is home to a monument to Vuk Kalajitović, commander of the Mileševa Chetnik Corps during World War II.
