= Drenova =

Drenova (Serbian Cyrillic: Дренова) is a Serbo-Croatian place name, derived from dren, meaning 'dogwoods', literally meaning 'place of dogwoods'. It may refer to:

- Drenova, Rijeka, suburb of Rijeka, Croatia
- Drenova, Brus, village in Serbia
- Drenova, Čajetina, village in Serbia
- Drenova, Prijepolje, village in Serbia
- Drenova, Gornji Milanovac, village in Serbia
- Velika Drenova, village near Trstenik, Serbia
- Drenova Glavica, village in Bosnia and Herzegovina
- Drenova Lake, near Prnjavor in Bosnia and Herzegovina
- Drenovë, village near Korçë in Albania

== See also ==
- Drenovac (disambiguation)
- Drenovo (disambiguation)
