= Rudine =

Rudine may refer to:

- Rudine (župa), a medieval country in what is now eastern Bosnia and Herzegovina
- Rudine, Serbia, a village near Čajetina, western Serbia
- Rudine (Glamoč), a village in Bosnia and Herzegovina
- Rudine (Sokolac), a village in Bosnia and Herzegovina
- Rudine, Split-Dalmatia County, a hamlet near Kaštel Novi, Croatia
- Rudine, Krk, a hamlet near Dobrinj, Croatia
- Rudine, Nikšić, a village near Nikšić, Montenegro
- Rudine, Tuzi, a village near Podgorica, Montenegro
- Rudine, Kosovo, a village near Zvečan, Kosovo
