= Šljivovica (disambiguation) =

Šljivovica is a fruit brandy.

Šljivovica may also refer to:

- Šljivovica, Čajetina, a village in the municipality of Čajetina, Serbia
- Šljivovica, Vushtrri, a village in the municipality of Vushtrri, Kosovo
