= Mačkat =

Mačkat Мачкат
- Village
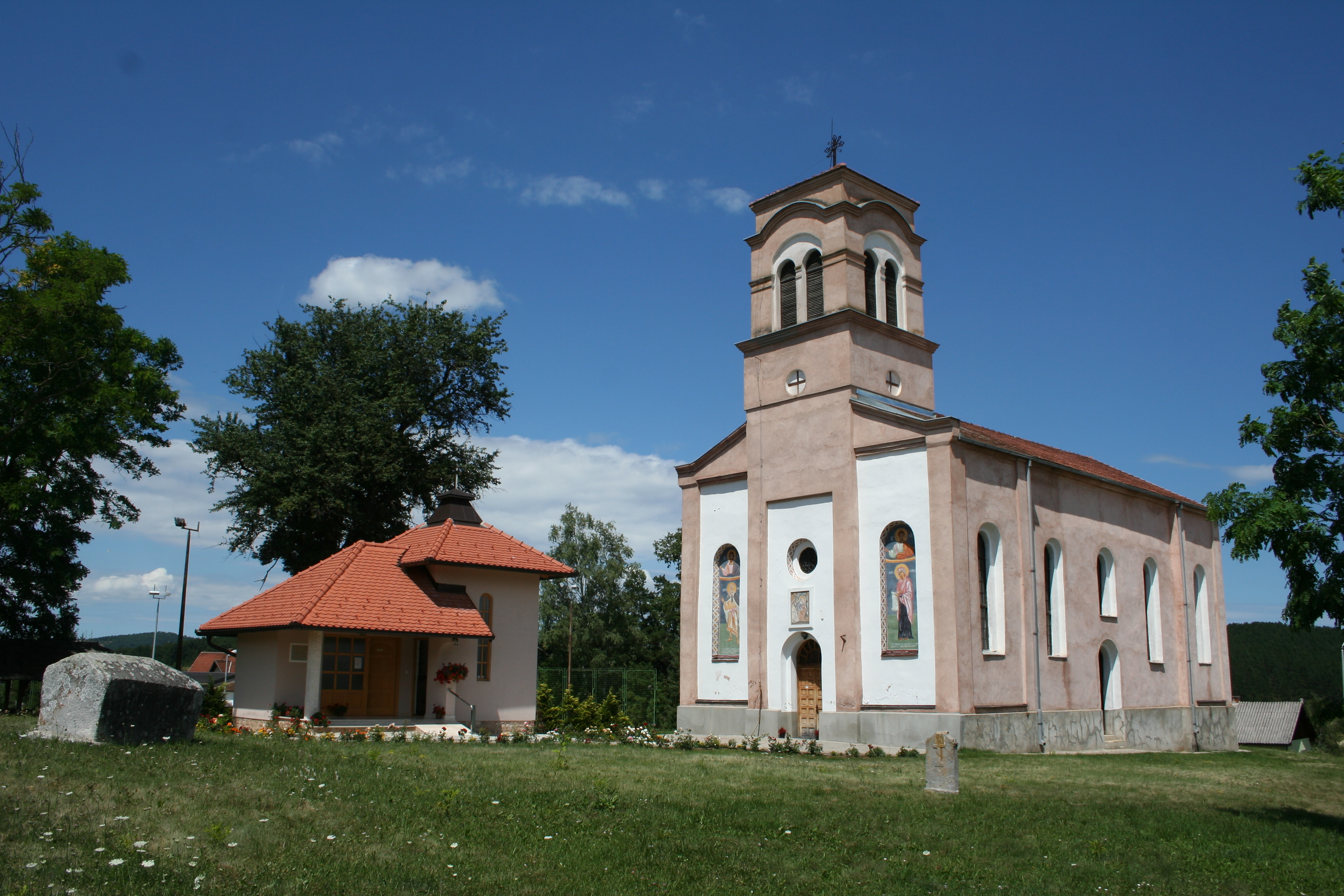
- Church in Mačkat

- Location within Serbia
- Coordinates: 43.7833°N 19.7667°E
- Country: Serbia
- District: Zlatibor District
- Municipality: Čajetina

Area
  - Total: 10.76 km^{2} (4.15 sq mi)
- Elevation: 750 m (2,460 ft)

Population (2011)
  - Total: 905
  - Density: 84.1/km^{2} (218/sq mi)
- Time zone: UTC+1 (CET)
  - Summer (DST): UTC+2 (CEST)

Mačkat (Serbian Cyrillic: Мачкат) is a village in Serbia situated in the municipality of Čajetina, and the district of Zlatibor. As of 2011, it has a population of 905 inhabitants.
