= Sainovina =

- Village
- Location within Serbia
- Coordinates: 43°48′N 19°40′E
- Country: Serbia
- District: Zlatibor District
- Municipality: Čajetina

Area
  - Total: 31.39 km^{2} (12.12 sq mi)
- Elevation: 734 m (2,408 ft)

Population (2011)
  - Total: 646
  - Density: 20.6/km^{2} (53.3/sq mi)
- Time zone: UTC+1 (CET)
  - Summer (DST): UTC+2 (CEST)

Sainovina is a village in the municipality of Čajetina, western Serbia. According to the 2011 census, the village has a population of 646 people.
