= Željine =

- Village
- Location within Serbia
- Coordinates: 43°39′N 19°53′E
- Country: Serbia
- District: Zlatibor District
- Municipality: Čajetina

Area
  - Total: 6.09 km^{2} (2.35 sq mi)
- Elevation: 827 m (2,713 ft)

Population (2011)
  - Total: 106
  - Density: 17.4/km^{2} (45.1/sq mi)
- Time zone: UTC+1 (CET)
  - Summer (DST): UTC+2 (CEST)

Željine is a village in the municipality of Čajetina, western Serbia. According to the 2011 census, the village has a population of 106 people.
