= Trnava (Čajetina) =

- Village
- Location within Serbia
- Coordinates: 43°41′N 19°48′E
- Country: Serbia
- District: Zlatibor District
- Municipality: Čajetina

Area
  - Total: 8.47 km^{2} (3.27 sq mi)
- Elevation: 589 m (1,932 ft)

Population (2011)
  - Total: 200
  - Density: 24/km^{2} (61/sq mi)
- Time zone: UTC+1 (CET)
  - Summer (DST): UTC+2 (CEST)

Trnava is a village in the municipality of Čajetina, western Serbia. According to the 2011 census, the village has a population of 200 people.
