= Čajetina =

Čajetina Чајетина (Serbian)
- Village and municipality
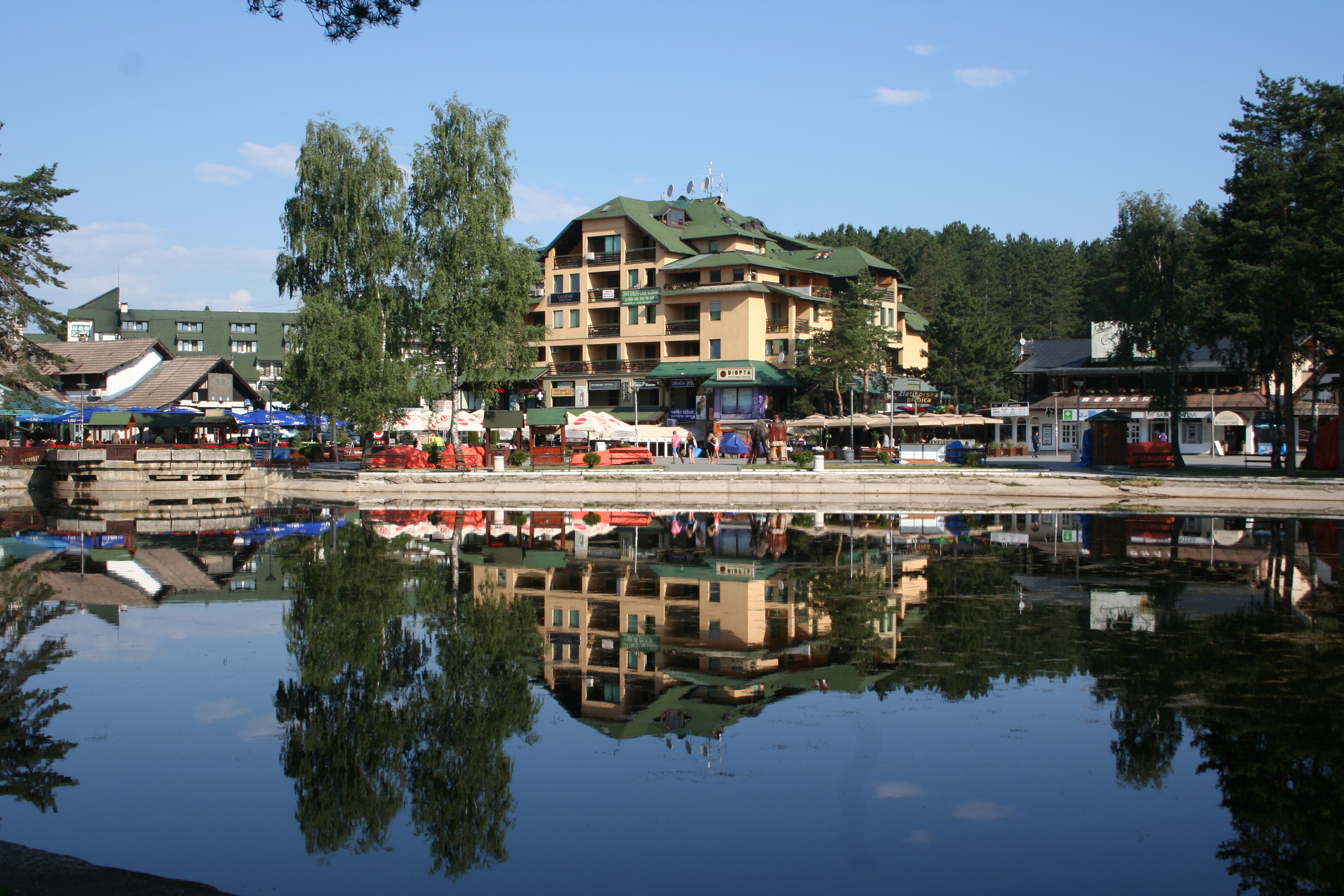
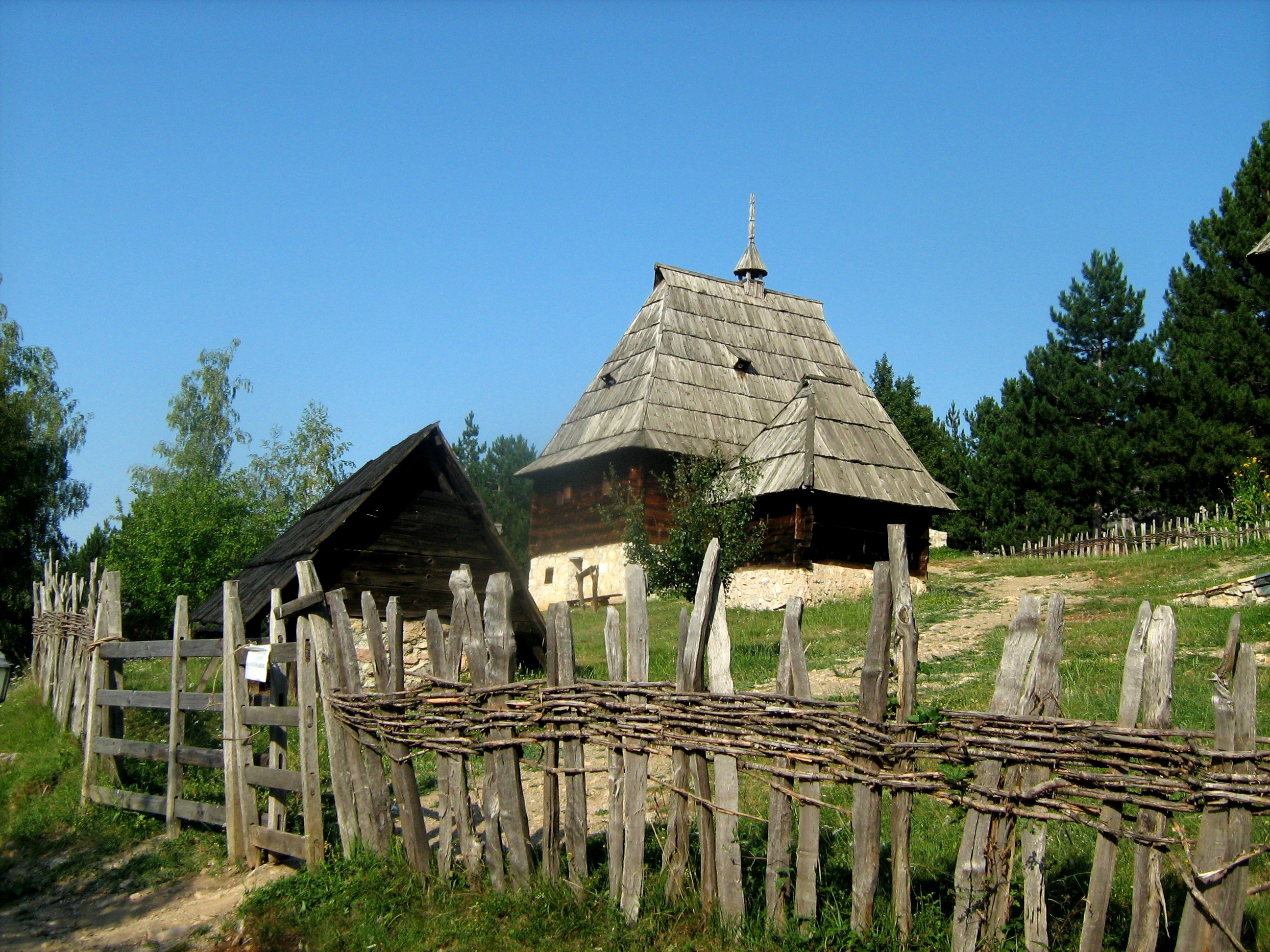
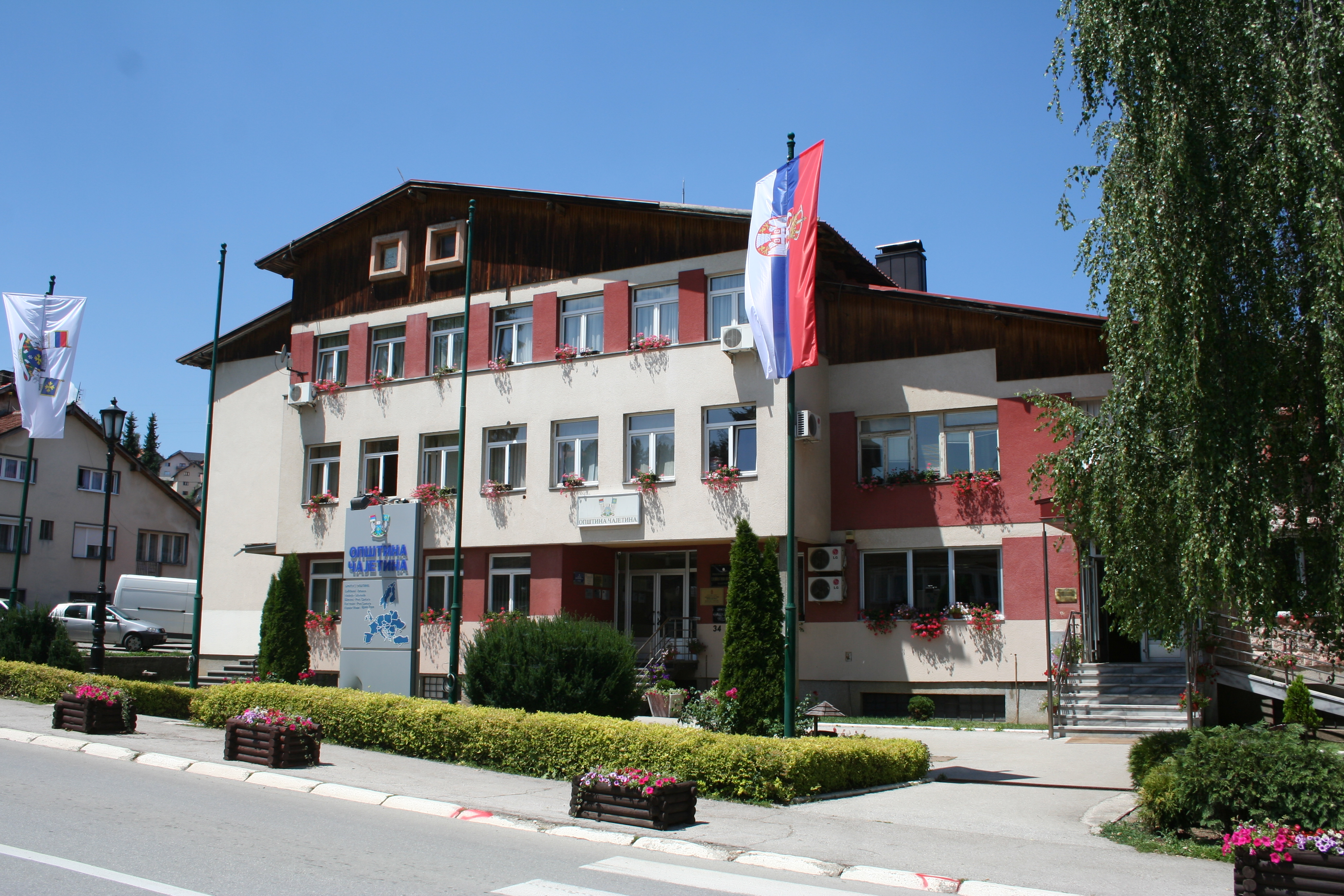

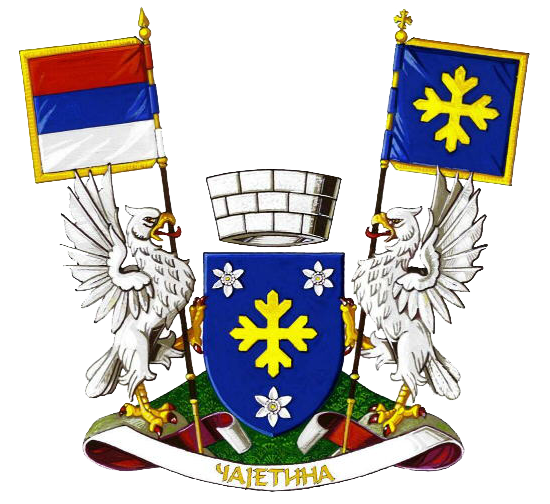
- Coat of arms

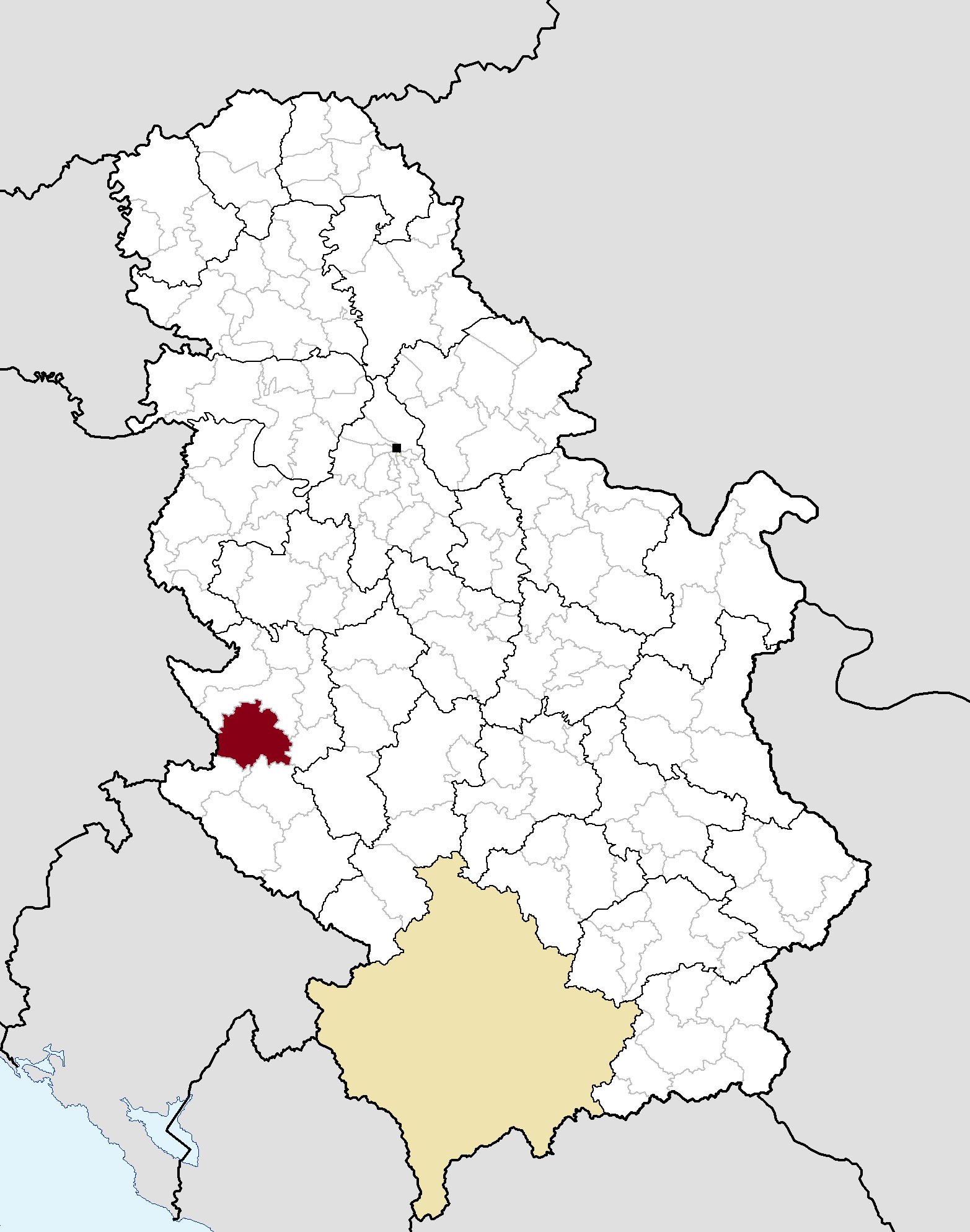
- Location of the municipality of Čajetina within Serbia
- Coordinates: 43°45′N 19°43′E
- Country: Serbia
- Region: Šumadija and Western Serbia
- District: Zlatibor
- Settlements: 20

Government
  - Mayor: Milan Stamatović (ZS)

Area
  - Urban: 39.32 km^{2} (15.18 sq mi)
  - Municipality: 647 km^{2} (250 sq mi)
- Elevation: 843 m (2,766 ft)

Population (2022 census)
  - Urban: 3,702
  - Urban density: 94.15/km^{2} (243.8/sq mi)
  - Municipality: 14,585
  - Municipality density: 22.5/km^{2} (58.4/sq mi)
- Time zone: UTC+1 (CET)
  - Summer (DST): UTC+2 (CEST)
- Postal code: 31310
- Area code: +381(0)31
- Car plates: UE
- Website: www.cajetina.org.rs

Čajetina (Serbian Cyrillic: Чајетина) is a small town and municipality located in the Zlatibor District of western Serbia. According to the 2022 census results, the municipality has 14,585 inhabitants. One of the most notable settlements in the municipality of Čajetina is a popular tourist town of Zlatibor.

== Climate ==
Čajetina has a humid continental climate (Köppen climate classification: Dfb).

Climate data for Čajetina
Month	Jan	Feb	Mar	Apr	May	Jun	Jul	Aug	Sep	Oct	Nov	Dec	Year
Mean daily maximum °C (°F)	1.2 (34.2)	4.1 (39.4)	9.0 (48.2)	12.5 (54.5)	17.3 (63.1)	20.8 (69.4)	23.0 (73.4)	23.2 (73.8)	19.9 (67.8)	14.8 (58.6)	7.5 (45.5)	2.9 (37.2)	13.0 (55.4)
Daily mean °C (°F)	−2.1 (28.2)	0.3 (32.5)	4.5 (40.1)	7.7 (45.9)	12.3 (54.1)	15.7 (60.3)	17.7 (63.9)	17.7 (63.9)	14.6 (58.3)	10.1 (50.2)	4.0 (39.2)	−0.1 (31.8)	8.5 (47.4)
Mean daily minimum °C (°F)	−5.4 (22.3)	−3.5 (25.7)	0.0 (32.0)	3.0 (37.4)	7.4 (45.3)	10.7 (51.3)	12.4 (54.3)	12.3 (54.1)	9.3 (48.7)	5.4 (41.7)	0.5 (32.9)	−3.1 (26.4)	4.1 (39.3)
Average precipitation mm (inches)	67 (2.6)	59 (2.3)	60 (2.4)	75 (3.0)	100 (3.9)	99 (3.9)	89 (3.5)	74 (2.9)	78 (3.1)	77 (3.0)	86 (3.4)	76 (3.0)	940 (37)
Source: Climate-Data.org

== Settlements ==
Aside from the town of Čajetina, the municipality comprises the following settlements:

- Alin Potok
- Branešci
- Golovo
- Gostilje
- Dobroselica
- Drenova
- Željine
- Zlatibor
- Jablanica
- Kriva Reka
- Ljubiš
- Mačkat
- Mušvete
- Rakovica
- Rožanstvo
- Rudine
- Sainovina
- Semegnjevo
- Sirogojno
- Stublo
- Tripkova
- Trnava
- Šljivovica

== Demographics ==
Historical population
Year	Pop.	±% p.a.
1948	20,266	—
1953	21,529	+1.22%
1961	20,716	−0.48%
1971	19,224	−0.74%
1981	17,098	−1.17%
1991	15,996	−0.66%
2002	15,628	−0.21%
2011	14,745	−0.64%
2022	14,585	−0.10%

According to the 2022 census results, the municipality has 14,585 inhabitants.

=== Ethnic groups ===
The ethnic composition of the municipality as of 2022:

Ethnic group	Population	%
Serbs	13,695	93.90%
Montenegrins	24	0.16%
Croats	16	0.11%
Russians	14	0.10%
Others	66	0.45%
Undeclared	164	1.12%
Unknown	606	4.15%
Total	14,585	

== Economy ==
The following table gives a preview of total number of registered people employed in legal entities per their core activity (as of 2022):

Activity	Total
Agriculture, forestry and fishing	58
Mining and quarrying	11
Manufacturing	1,305
Electricity, gas, steam and air conditioning supply	37
Water supply; sewerage, waste management and remediation activities	234
Construction	498
Wholesale and retail trade, repair of motor vehicles and motorcycles	723
Transportation and storage	164
Accommodation and food services	1,762
Information and communication	21
Financial and insurance activities	34
Real estate activities	63
Professional, scientific and technical activities	160
Administrative and support service activities	176
Public administration and defense; compulsory social security	287
Education	278
Human health and social work activities	338
Arts, entertainment and recreation	221
Other service activities	88
Individual agricultural workers	140
Total	6,598

== Sports ==
Local football club Zlatibor has played in the Serbian Superliga, the top level in Serbian football.

== Gallery ==
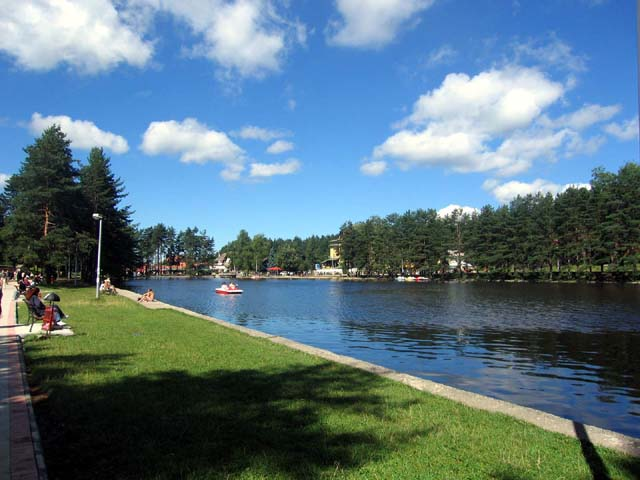
Zlatibor town center with lake

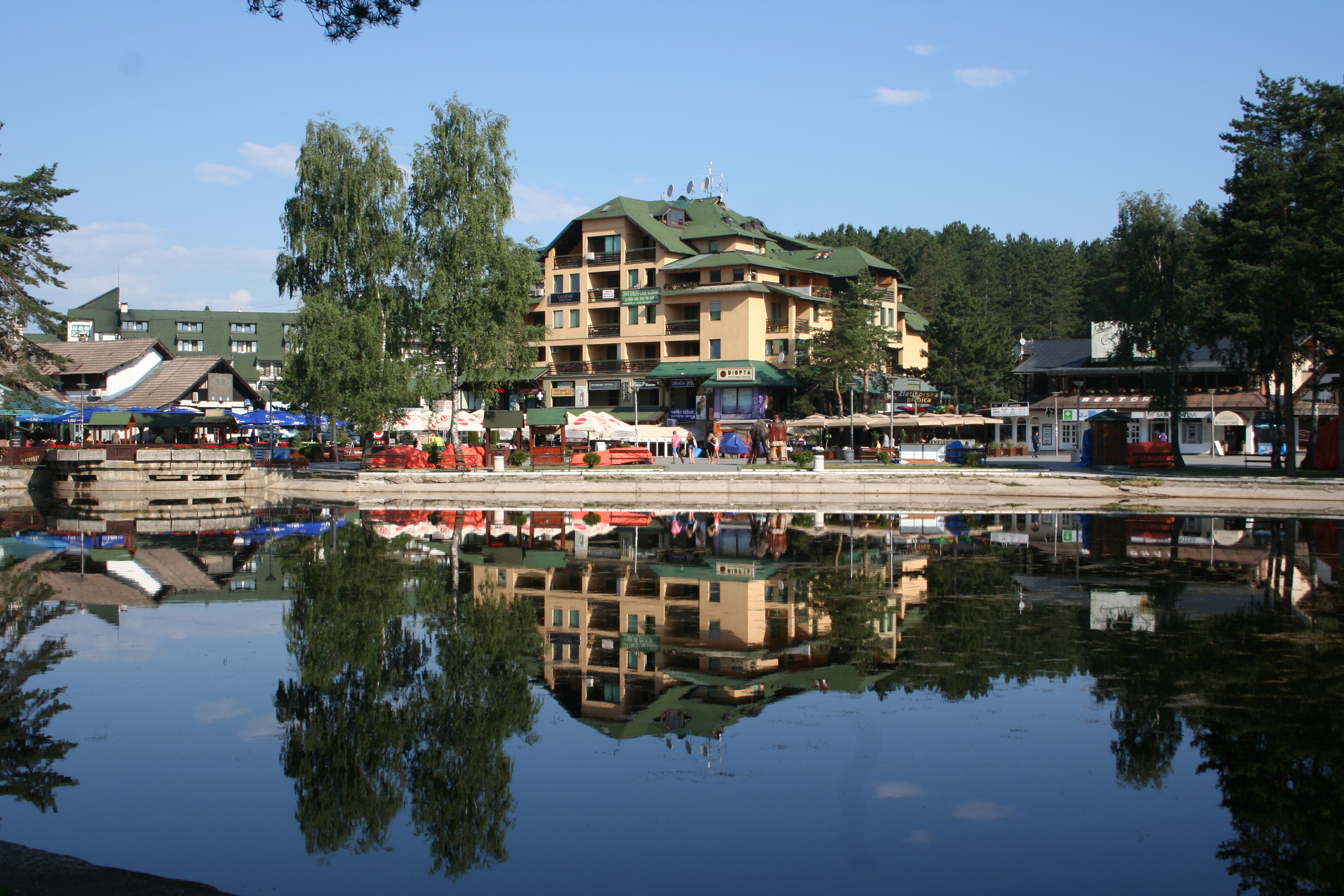
Zlatibor town center

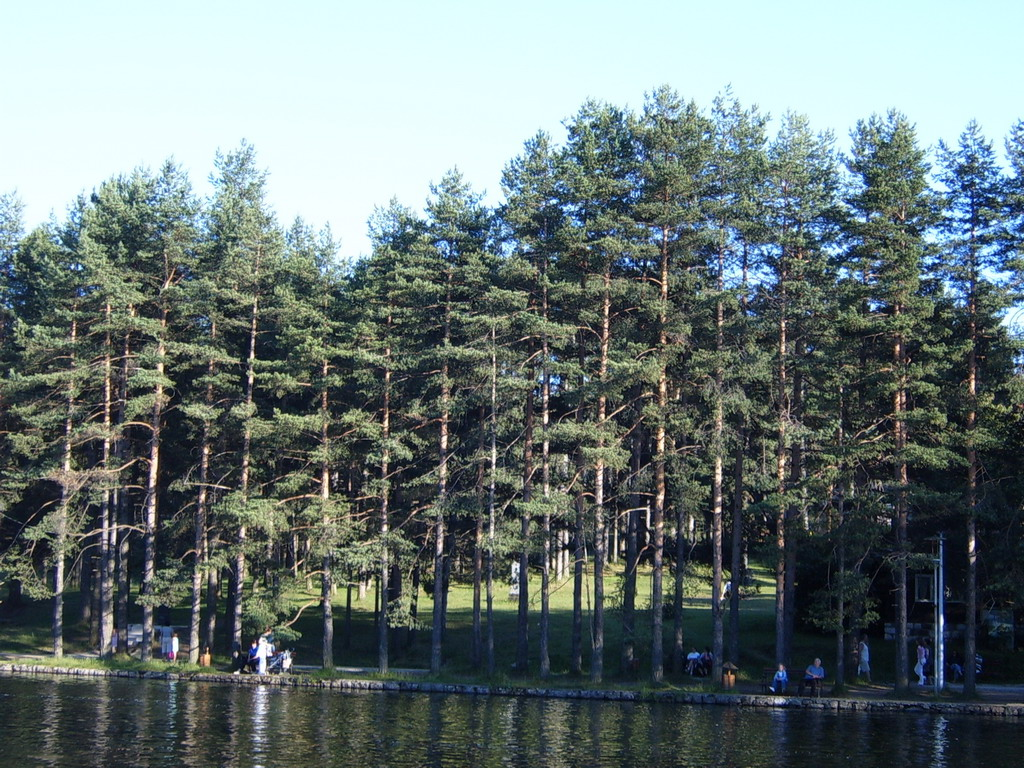
Zlatibor lake with surroundings

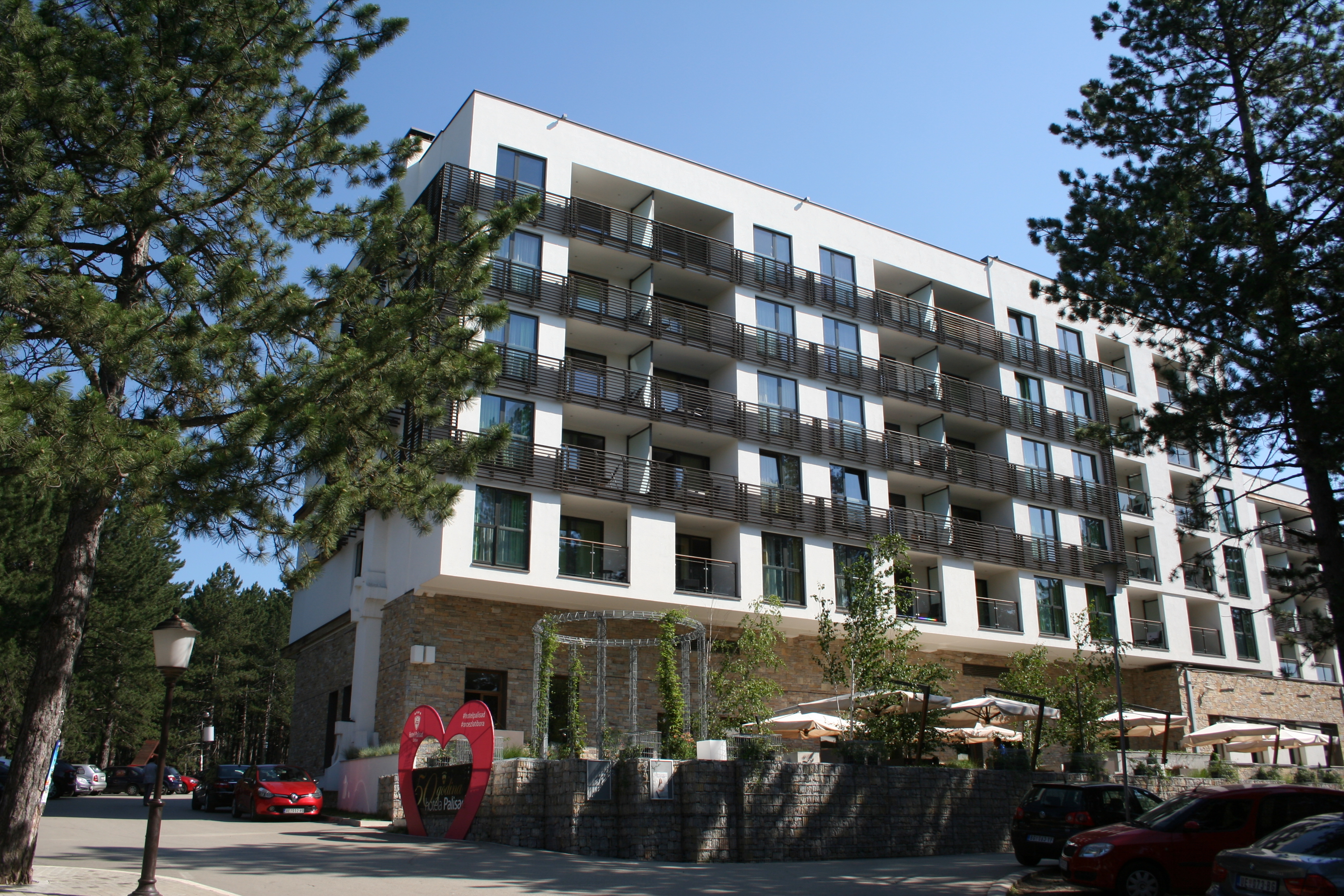
Zlatibor Spa Hotel

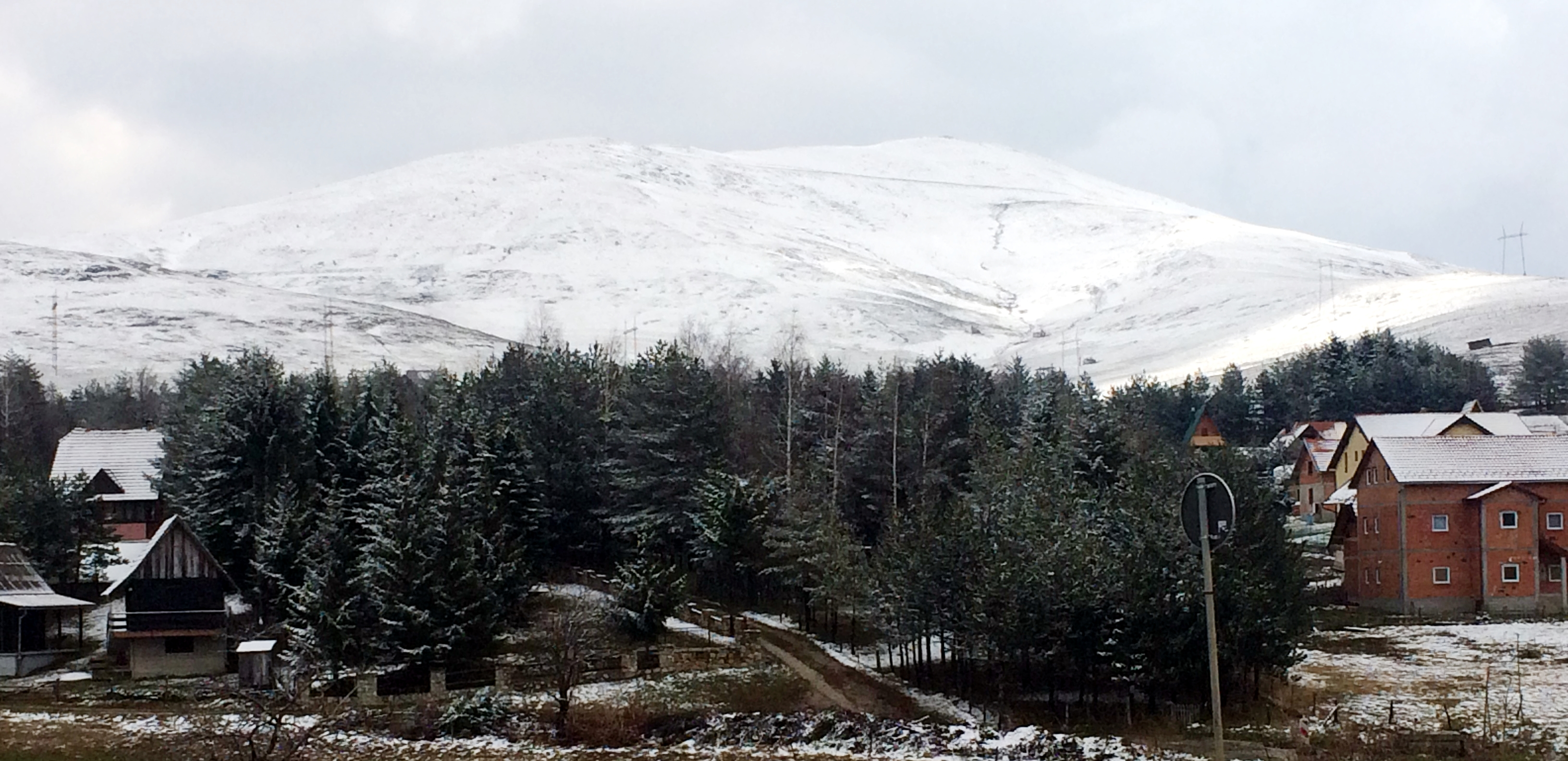
Zlatibor landscape

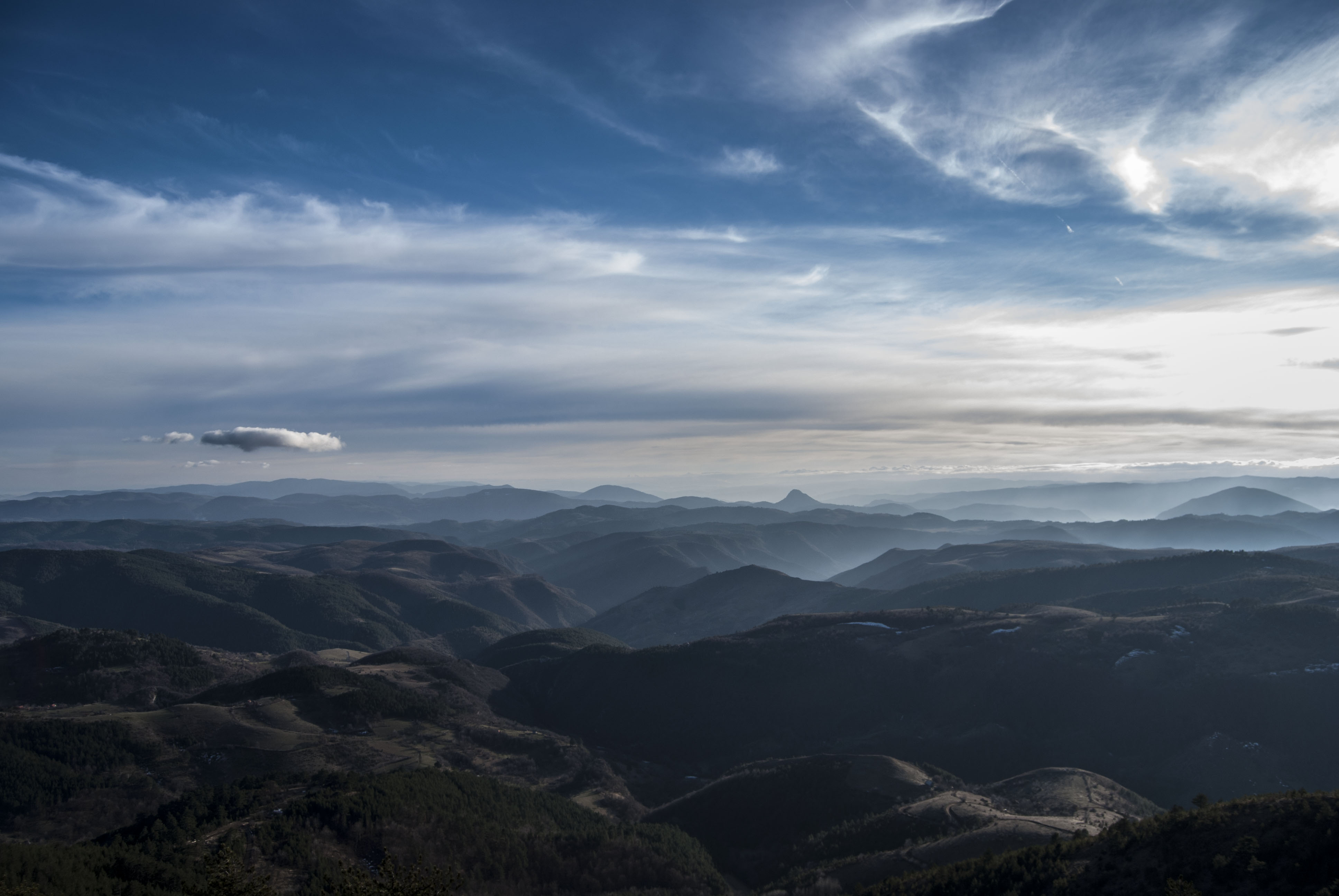
Zlatibor landscape from Ravni Tornik

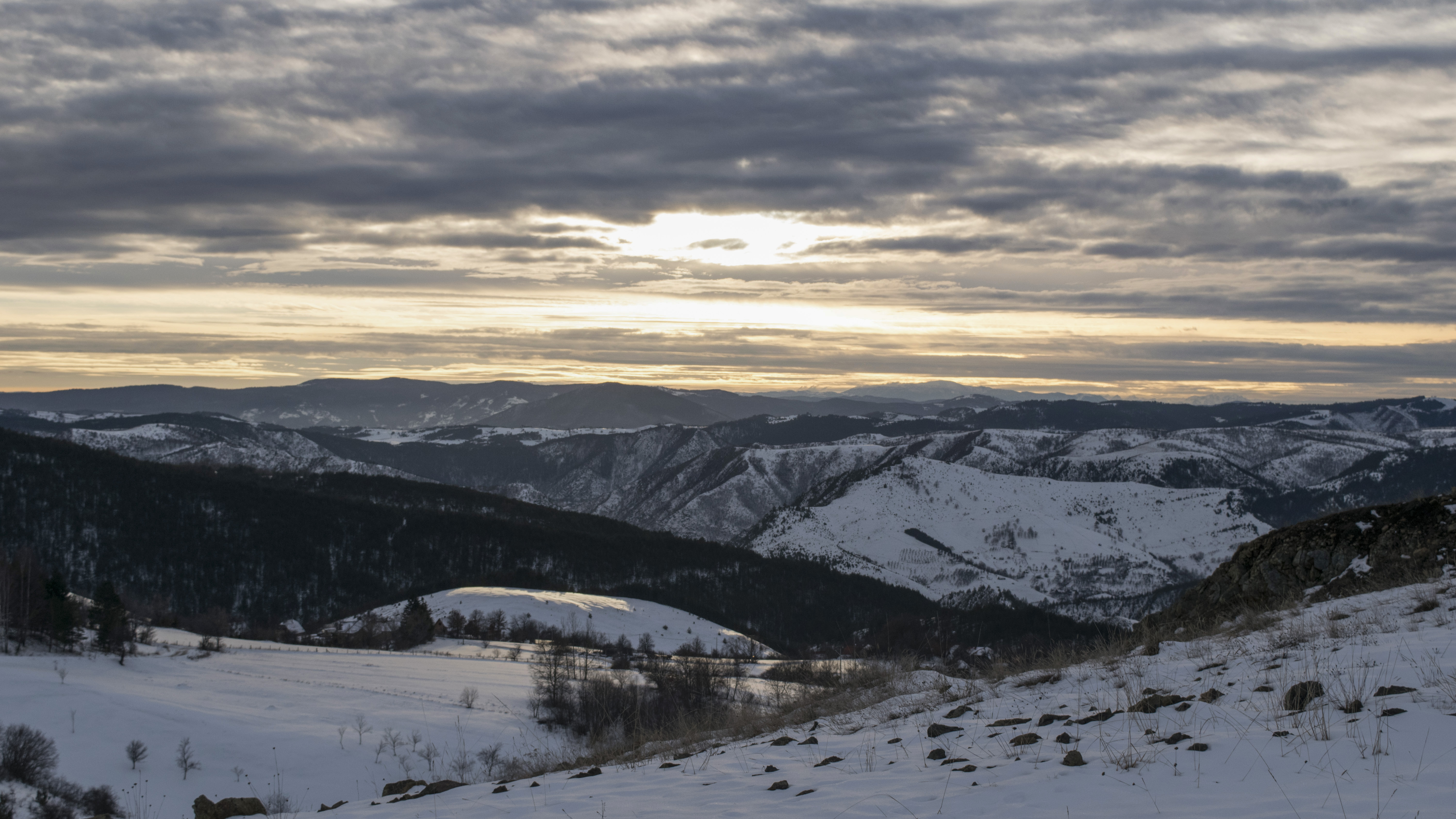
Zlatibor panorama

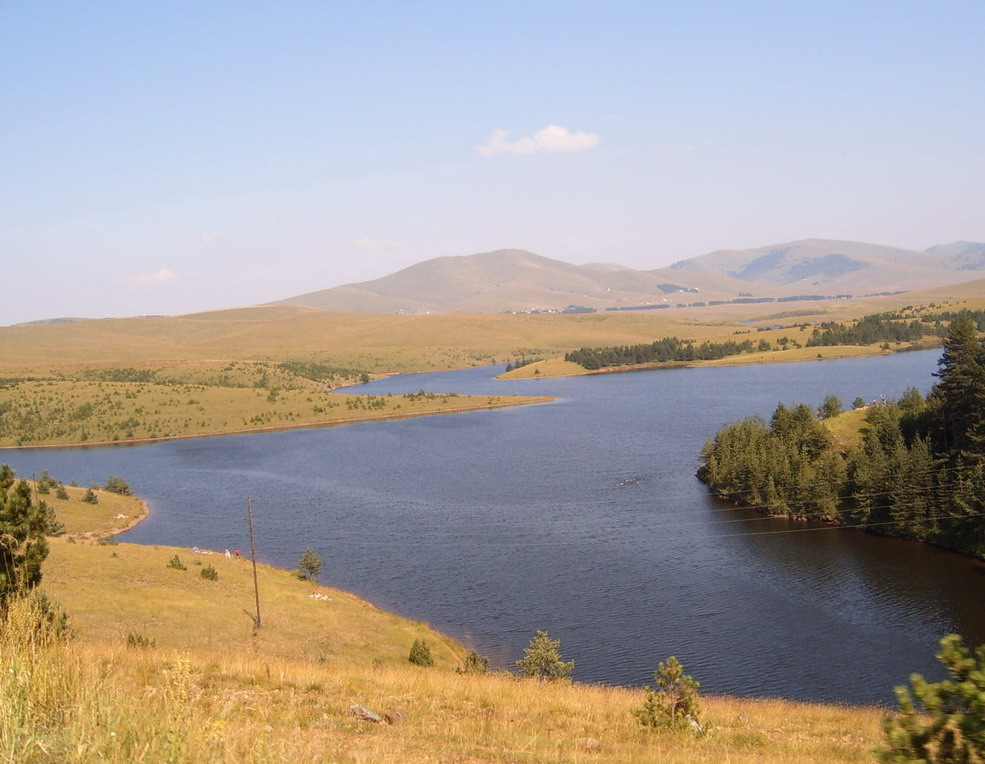
Ribnica Lake

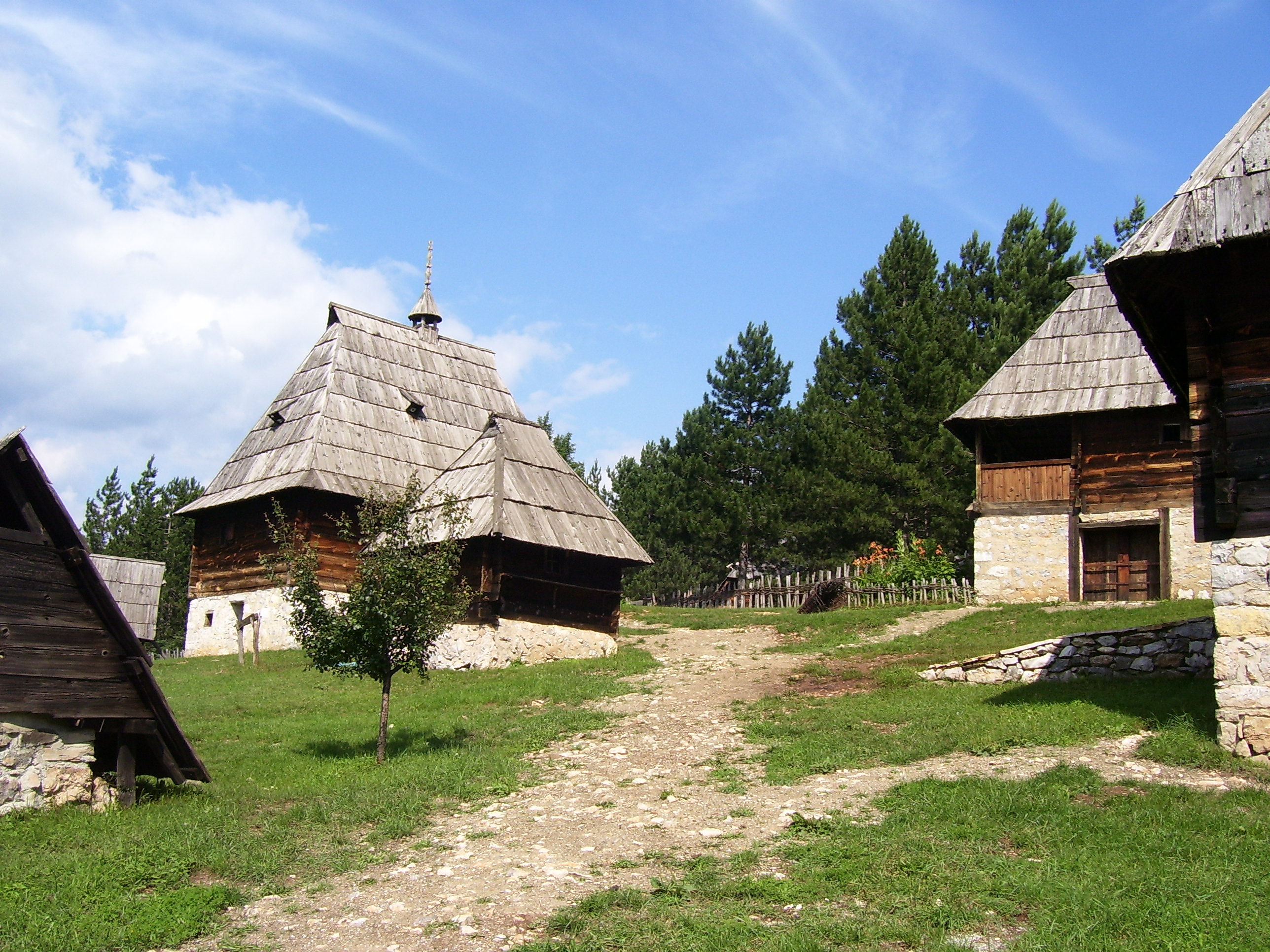
Sirogojno

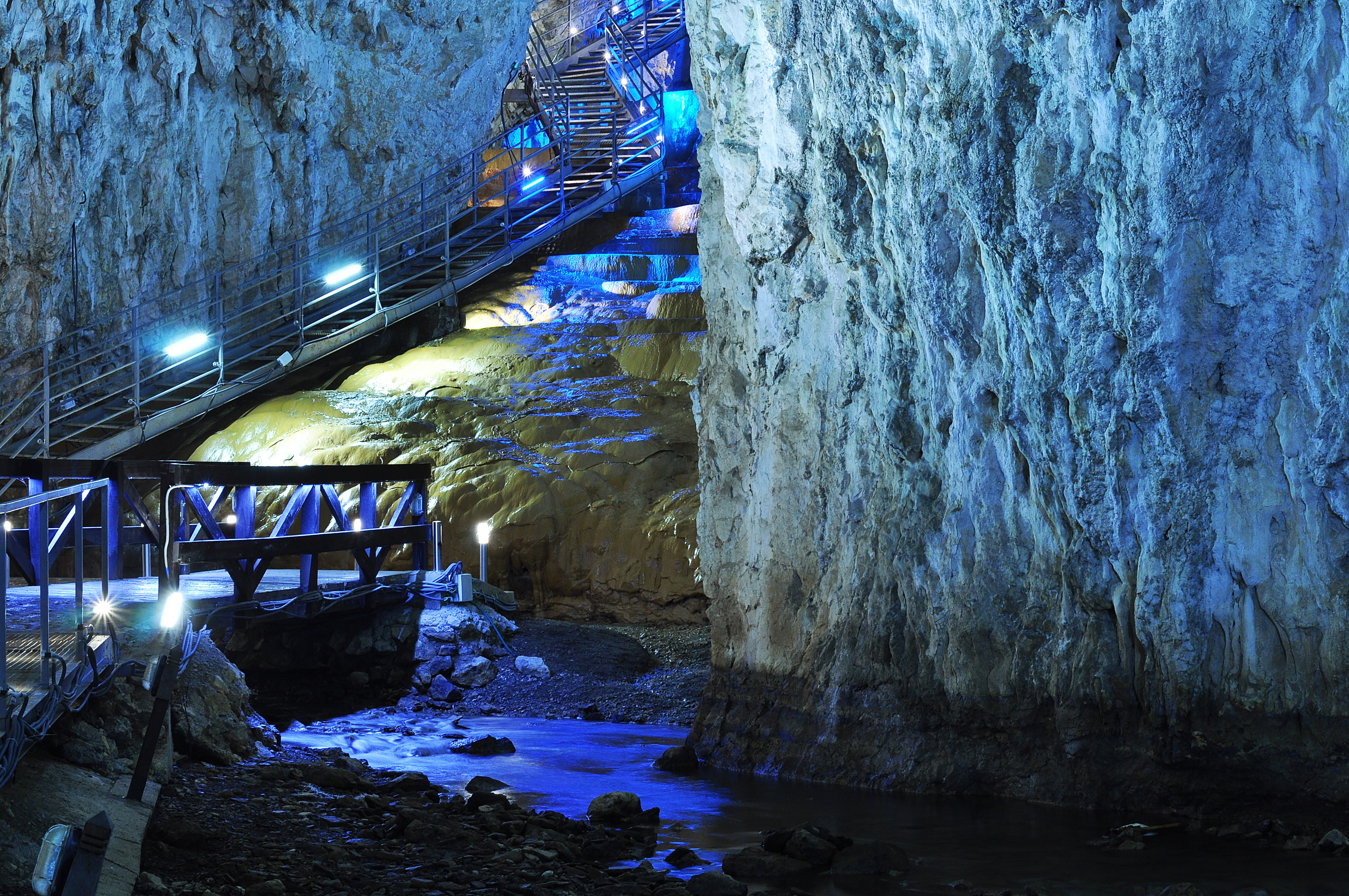
Stopića cave

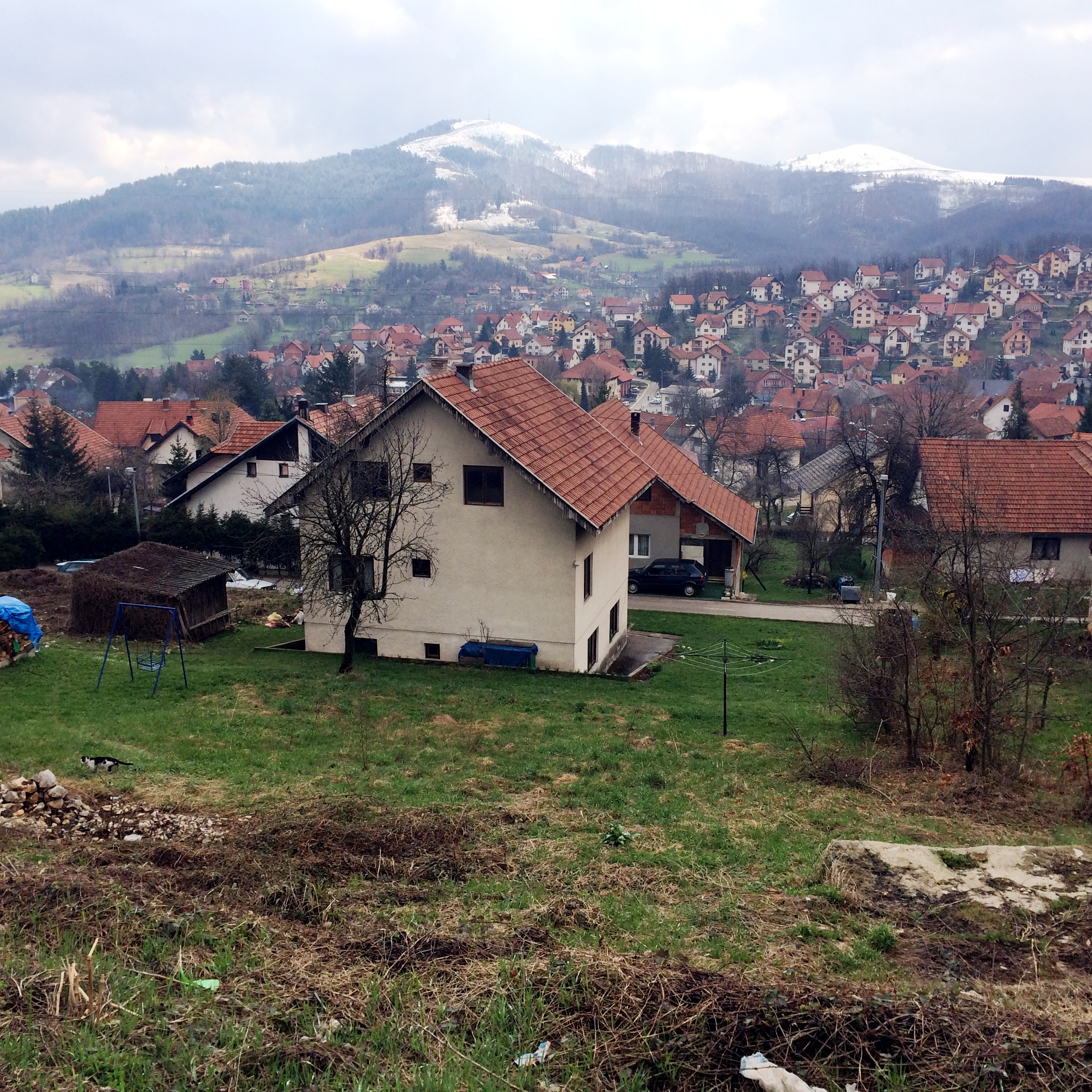
Čajetina town panorama

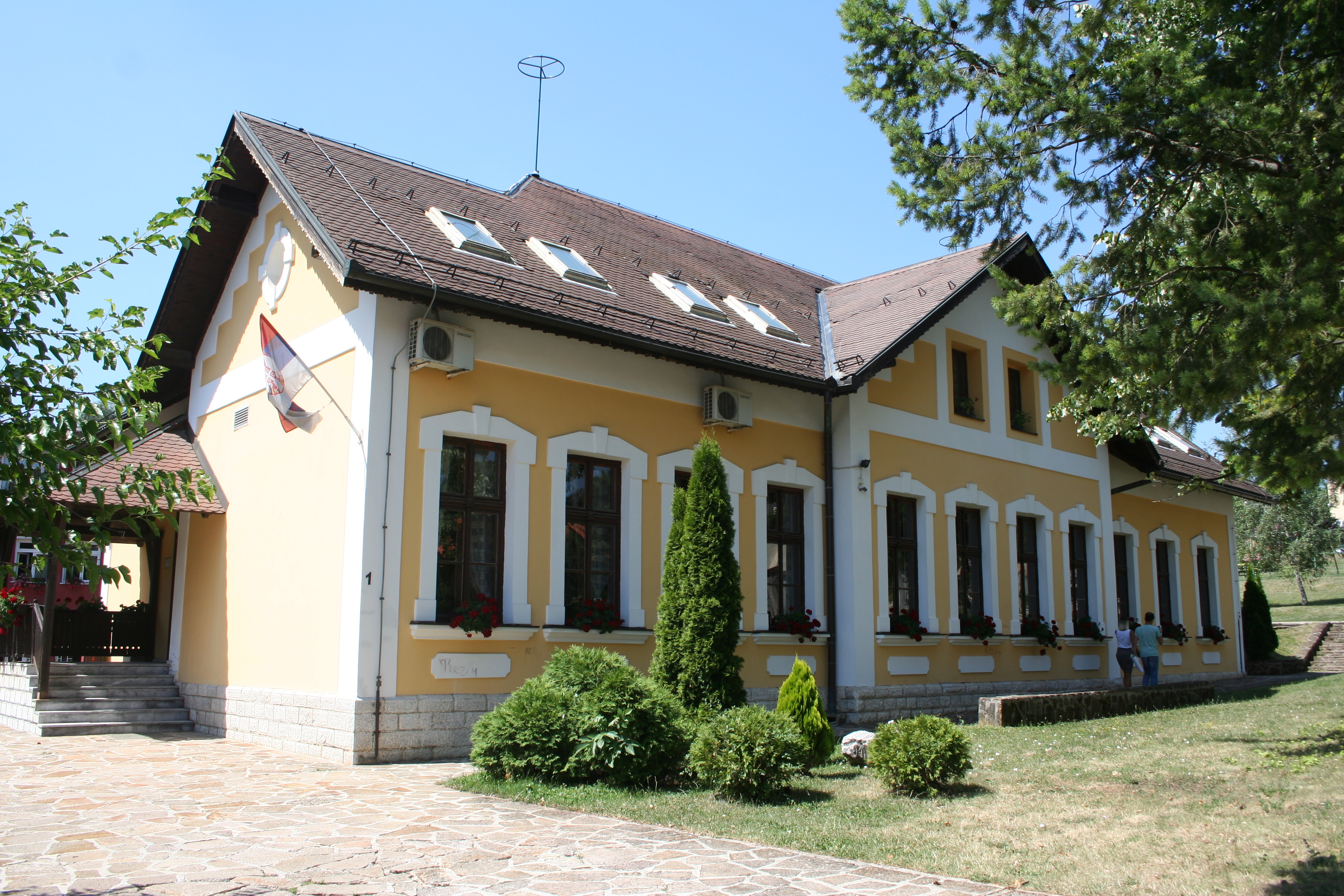
Čajetina Library

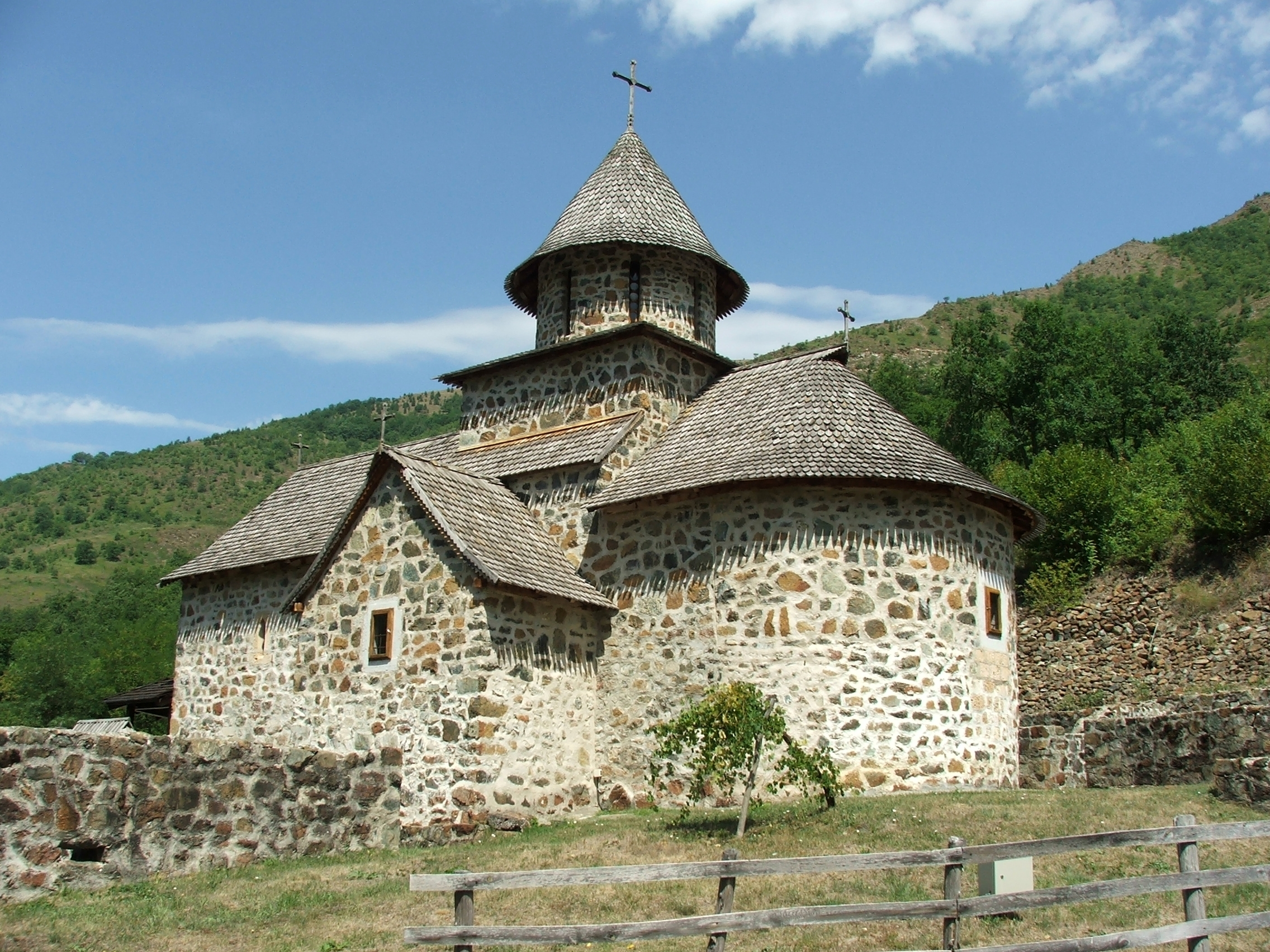
Uvac Monastery

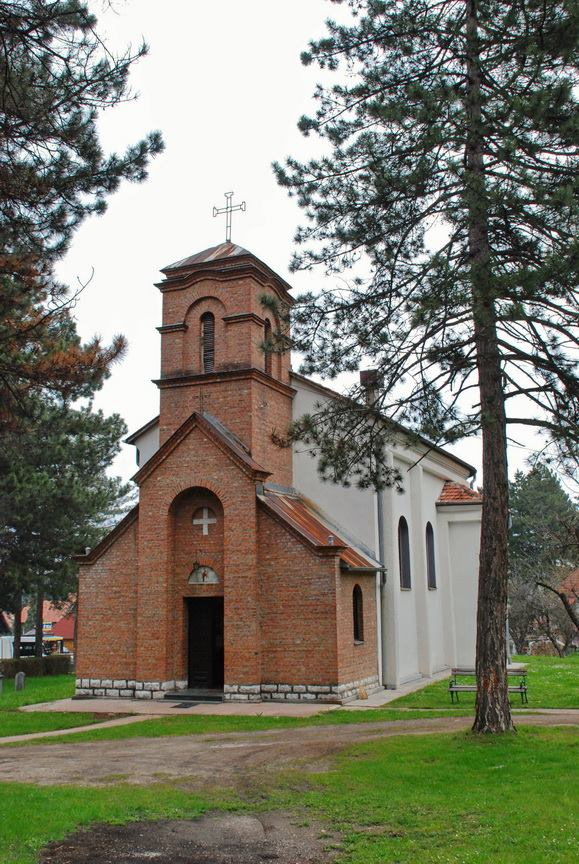
St. Gabriel Church

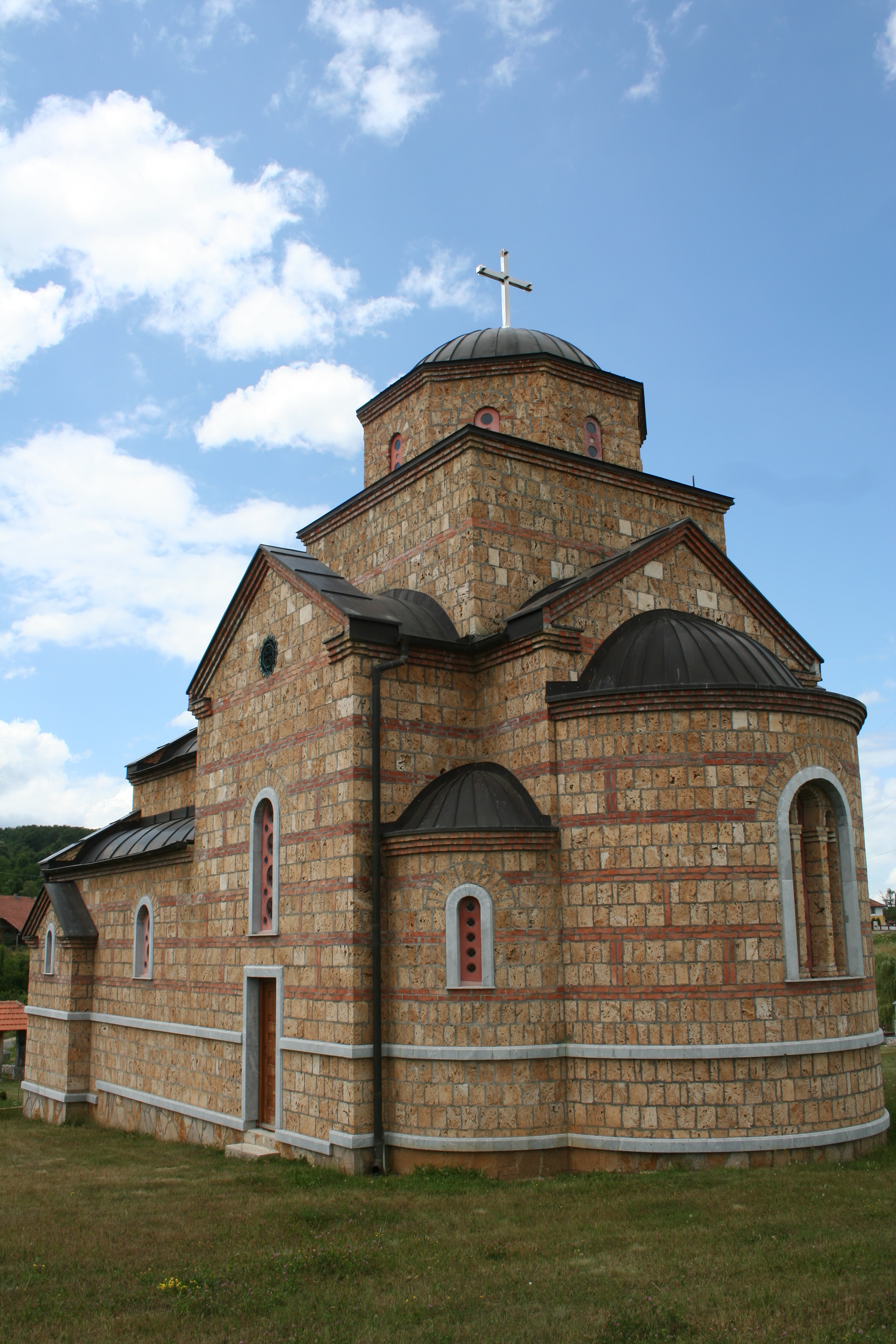
Kriva Reka Church

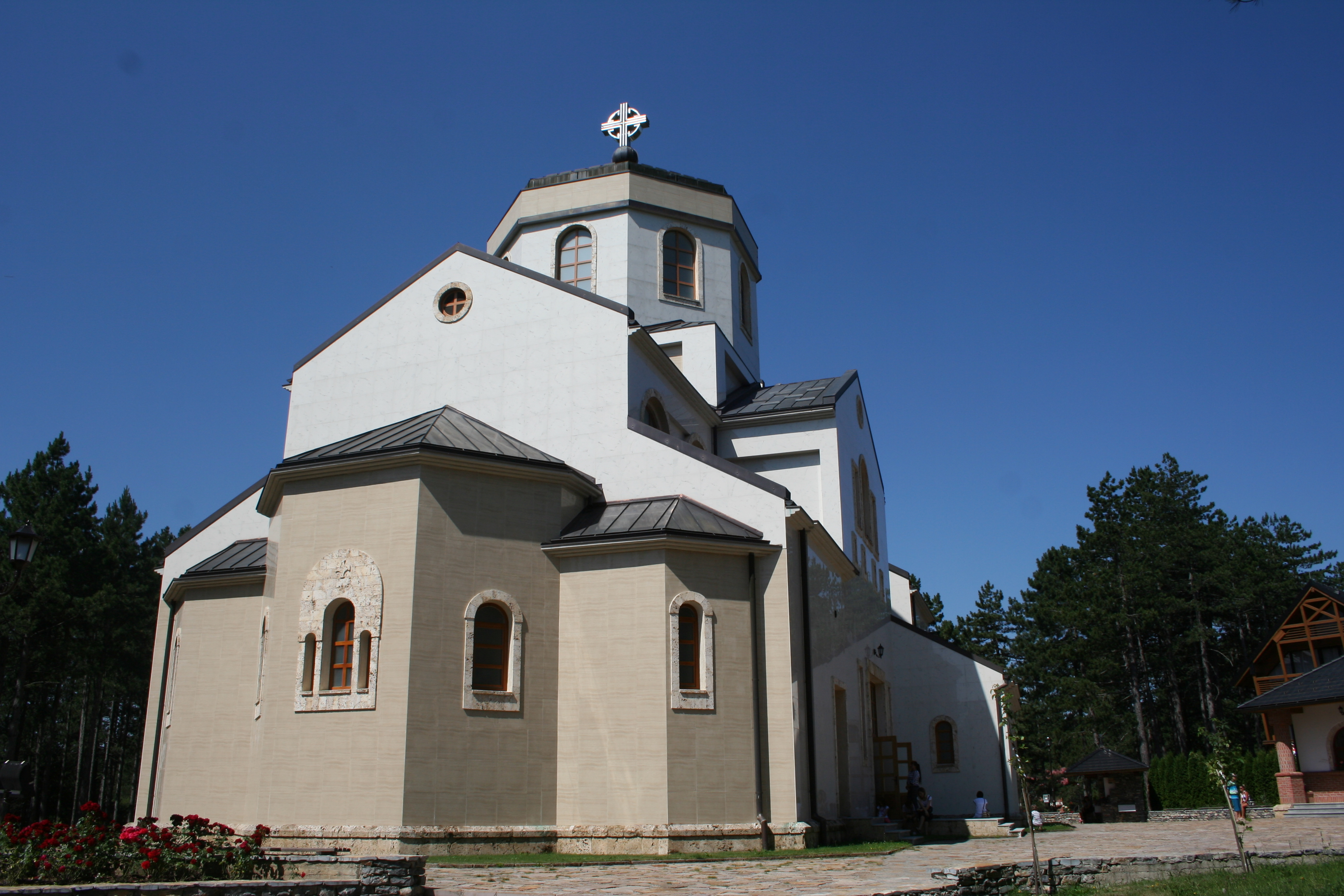
Zlatibor Church

== Twin towns ==
- Herceg Novi, Montenegro
- Lefkimmi, Greece
- Nazarje, Slovenia
- Šamac, Bosnia and Herzegovina
