= Tripkova =

- Village
- Location within Serbia
- Coordinates: 43°49′N 19°45′E
- Country: Serbia
- District: Zlatibor District
- Municipality: Čajetina

Area
  - Total: 17.07 km^{2} (6.59 sq mi)
- Elevation: 665 m (2,182 ft)

Population (2011)
  - Total: 303
  - Density: 17.8/km^{2} (46.0/sq mi)
- Time zone: UTC+1 (CET)
  - Summer (DST): UTC+2 (CEST)

Tripkova is a village in the municipality of Čajetina, western Serbia. According to the 2011 census, the village has a population of 303 people.
