= Rakovica, Čajetina =

Rakovica
- Village
- Interactive map of Rakovica
- Location within Serbia
- Coordinates: 43°39′N 19°47′E
- Country: Serbia
- District: Zlatibor District
- Municipality: Čajetina

Area
  - Total: 16.20 km^{2} (6.25 sq mi)
- Elevation: 1,056 m (3,465 ft)

Population (2011)
  - Total: 60
  - Density: 3.7/km^{2} (9.6/sq mi)
- Time zone: UTC+1 (CET)
  - Summer (DST): UTC+2 (CEST)

Rakovica is a village in the municipality of Čajetina, western Serbia. According to the 2011 census, the village has a population of 60 people.
