= Branešci (Čajetina) =

Coordinates: 43°46′N 19°41′E

- Village
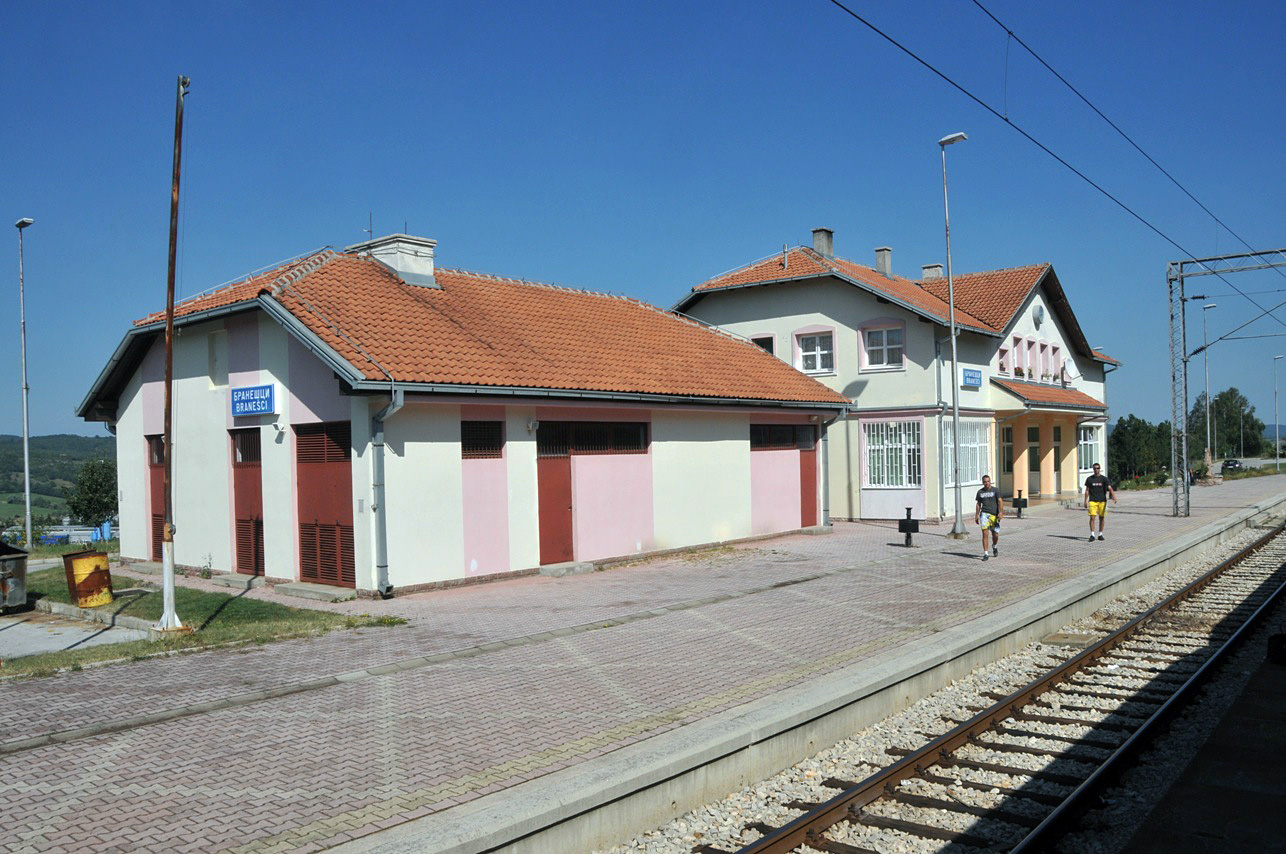
- Branesci rail station, Serbia
- Interactive map of Branešci
- Country: Serbia
- District: Zlatibor District
- Municipality: Čajetina

Area
  - Total: 34.93 km^{2} (13.49 sq mi)
- Elevation: 769 m (2,523 ft)

Population (2011)
  - Total: 737
  - Density: 21.1/km^{2} (54.6/sq mi)
- Time zone: UTC+1 (CET)
  - Summer (DST): UTC+2 (CEST)

Branešci is a village in the municipality of Čajetina, western Serbia. According to the 2011 census, the village has a population of 737 people.
