= Kriva Reka (Čajetina) =

- Village
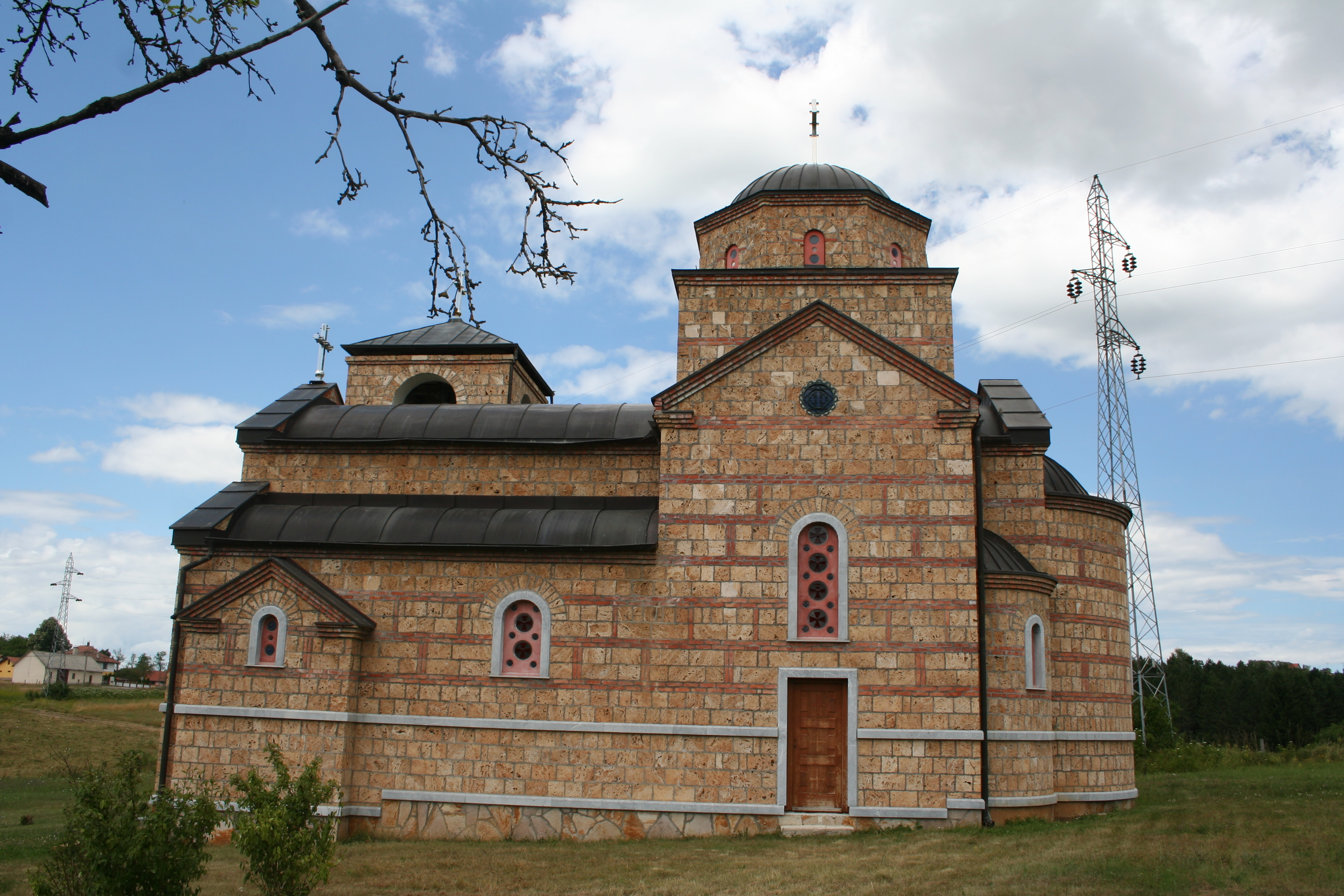

- Location within Serbia
- Coordinates: 43°47′N 19°48′E
- Country: Serbia
- District: Zlatibor District
- Municipality: Čajetina

Area
  - Total: 25.63 km^{2} (9.90 sq mi)
- Elevation: 741 m (2,431 ft)

Population (2011)
  - Total: 1,157
  - Density: 45.14/km^{2} (116.9/sq mi)
- Time zone: UTC+1 (CET)
  - Summer (DST): UTC+2 (CEST)

Kriva Reka is a village in the municipality of Čajetina, western Serbia. According to the 2011 census, the village has a population of 1,157 people.
