= Alin Potok =

- Village
- Location within Serbia
- Coordinates: 43°42′N 19°47′E
- Country: Serbia
- District: Zlatibor District
- Municipality: Čajetina

Area
  - Total: 24.68 km^{2} (9.53 sq mi)
- Elevation: 981 m (3,219 ft)

Population (2011)
  - Total: 190
  - Density: 7.7/km^{2} (20/sq mi)
- Time zone: UTC+1 (CET)
  - Summer (DST): UTC+2 (CEST)

Alin Potok is a village in the municipality of Čajetina, western Serbia. According to the 2011 census, the village has a population of 190 people.
