= Mušvete =

- Village
- Location within Serbia
- Coordinates: 43°44′N 19°45′E
- Country: Serbia
- District: Zlatibor District
- Municipality: Čajetina

Area
  - Total: 14.48 km^{2} (5.59 sq mi)
- Elevation: 917 m (3,009 ft)

Population (2011)
  - Total: 242
  - Density: 16.7/km^{2} (43.3/sq mi)
- Time zone: UTC+1 (CET)
  - Summer (DST): UTC+2 (CEST)

Mušvete is a village in the municipality of Čajetina, western Serbia. As of the 2011 census, the village has a population of 242 people.
