= Golovo =

- Village
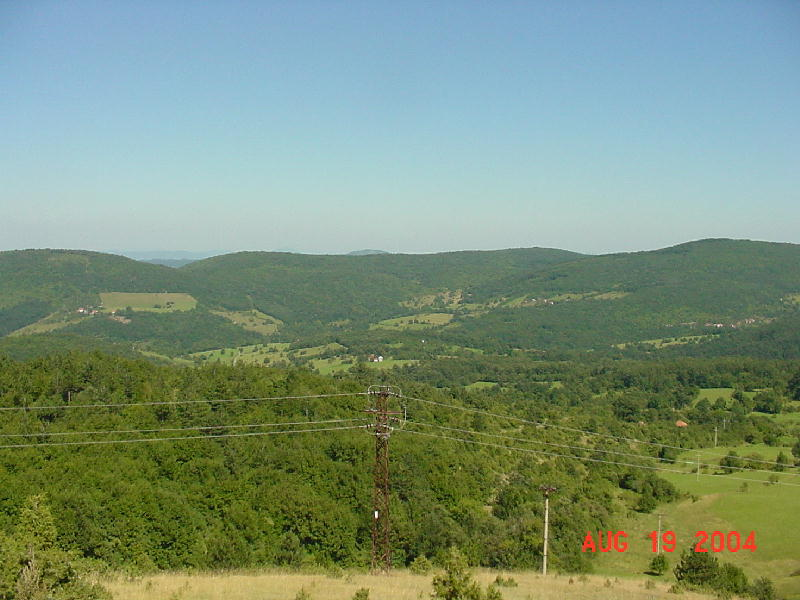

- Location within Serbia
- Coordinates: 43°43′N 19°47′E
- Country: Serbia
- District: Zlatibor District
- Municipality: Čajetina

Area
  - Total: 11.68 km^{2} (4.51 sq mi)
- Elevation: 879 m (2,884 ft)

Population (2011)
  - Total: 169
  - Density: 14.5/km^{2} (37.5/sq mi)
- Time zone: UTC+1 (CET)
  - Summer (DST): UTC+2 (CEST)

Golovo is a village in the municipality of Čajetina, western Serbia. At the 2011 census, the village had a population of 169 people.
