= Drenovo =

Drenovo may refer to:

- In Bulgaria (written in Cyrillic as Дреново):
  - Drenovo, Blagoevgrad Province - a village in the Petrich municipality, Blagoevgrad province
  - Drenovo, Sofia Province - a village in the Kostinbrod municipality, Sofia province
  - Drenkovo - a village in the Blagoevgrad municipality, Blagoevgrad province, known until 1960 as Drenovo
- In North Macedonia (written in Cyrillic as Дреново):
  - Drenovo, Čaška - a village in the Čaška Municipality
  - Drenovo, Makedonski Brod - a village in the Makedonski Brod Municipality
  - Drenovo, Kavadarci
- In Albania
  - Drenovë (written in Bulgarian and Macedonian in Cyrillic as Дреново)

== See also ==
- Dryanovo - a town and municipality in Gabrovo Province, Bulgaria
