= Drenovac =

Drenovac may refer to:

== Places ==
- Drenovac, Knjaževac, a village in Knjaževac, Zaječar, Serbia
- Drenovac, Paraćin, a village in Paraćin, Pomoravlje District, Serbia
- Drenovac, Prokuplje, a village in Prokuplje, Toplica, Serbia
- Drenovac, Šabac, a town in Šabac, Mačva District, Serbia
- Drenovac, Stanovo, a village in Stanovo, Šumadija District, Serbia
- Drenovac, Vranje, a village in Vranje, Pčinja, Serbia

== People ==
- Božidar Drenovac (1922–2003), Serbian football player and manager
- Đorđe Drenovac (born 1992), Serbian basketball player
