= Rudine (Čajetina) =

- Village
- Location within Serbia
- Coordinates: 43°47′N 19°40′E
- Country: Serbia
- District: Zlatibor District
- Municipality: Čajetina

Area
  - Total: 12.83 km^{2} (4.95 sq mi)
- Elevation: 690 m (2,260 ft)

Population (2011)
  - Total: 144
  - Density: 11.2/km^{2} (29.1/sq mi)
- Time zone: UTC+1 (CET)
  - Summer (DST): UTC+2 (CEST)

Rudine is a village in the municipality of Čajetina, western Serbia. According to the 2011 census, the village has a population of 144 people.
