= Shlivovica, Vushtrri =

Shlivovicë Šljivovica
- Village
- Location within Kosovo
- Coordinates: 42°53′24″N 20°59′38″E
- Country: Kosovo
- District: Mitrovica
- Municipality: Vushtrri
- Elevation: 2,346 ft (715 m)

Population (2011)
  - Total: 14
- Time zone: UTC+1 (CET)
  - Summer (DST): UTC+2 (CEST)

Shlivovica (Albanian: Shlivovicë/Lajthizë;Serbian: Šljivovica) is a village in the municipality of Vushtrri, Kosovo. According to the 2011 census, the village has a population of 14 inhabitants. In the village there are the ruins of an old church and an old cemetery.

== Population ==
Population of Šljivovica
1948	1953	1961	1971	1981	1991	2011
169	187	183	167	92	102	14
