= Drenova (Čajetina) =

- Village
- Location within Serbia
- Coordinates: 43°38′N 19°50′E
- Country: Serbia
- District: Zlatibor District
- Municipality: Čajetina

Area
  - Total: 6.12 km^{2} (2.36 sq mi)
- Elevation: 781 m (2,562 ft)

Population (2011)
  - Total: 96
  - Density: 16/km^{2} (41/sq mi)
- Time zone: UTC+1 (CET)
  - Summer (DST): UTC+2 (CEST)

Drenova is a village in the municipality of Čajetina, western Serbia. According to the 2011 census, the village had a population of 96 inhabitants.
