= Drenovo, Makedonski Brod =

Drenovo Дреново
- Village
- Location within North Macedonia
- Coordinates: 41.4653°N 21.2372°E
- Country: North Macedonia
- Region: Southwestern
- Municipality: Makedonski Brod

Population (2002)
  - Total: 33
- Time zone: UTC+1 (CET)
  - Summer (DST): UTC+2 (CEST)

Drenovo (Macedonian: Дреново) is a small village located in the municipality of Makedonski Brod, North Macedonia.

== Name ==
The village is known as Drenovë in Albanian.

== History ==
The village is attested in the 1467/68 Ottoman tax registry (defter) for the Nahiyah of Kırçova. The village had a total of 9 houses, excluding bachelors (mucerred).

During the Balkan wars, Serbian chetniks massacred 50 Albanian families in the village of Drenovo.

== Demographics ==
In statistics gathered by Vasil Kanchov in 1900, the village of Drenovo was inhabited by 220 Muslim Albanians. According to the 1929 ethnographic map by Russian Slavist Afanasy Selishchev, Drenovo was an Albanian village.

According to the 2002 census, the village had a total of 33 inhabitants. Ethnic groups in the village include:

- Macedonians 33

According to the 2021 census, the village had a total of 17 inhabitants. Ethnic groups in the village include:

- Macedonians 16
- Albanians 1
