= Šljivovica, Čajetina =

Šljivovica Шљивовица
- Village
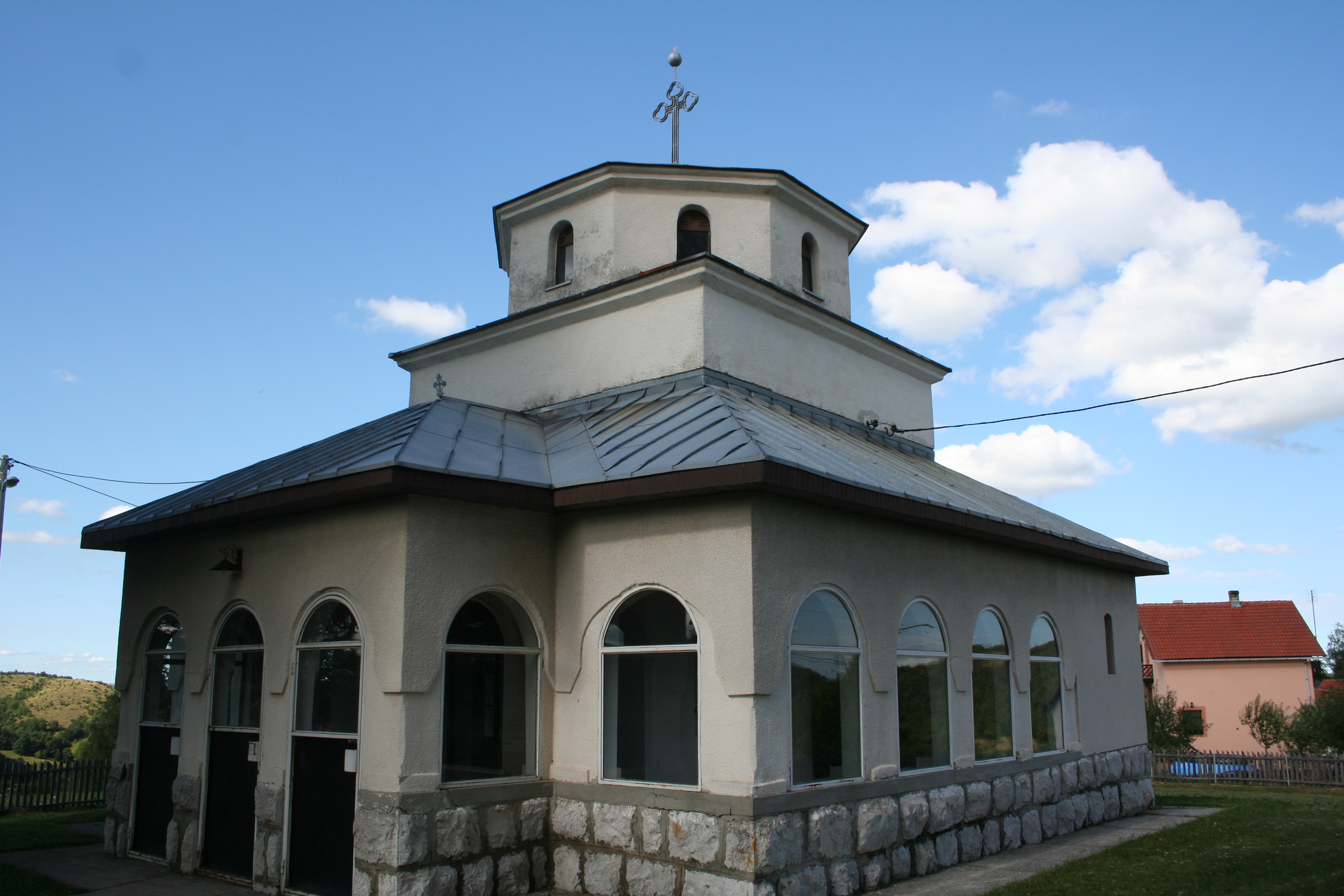

- Location within Serbia
- Coordinates: 43°48′41″N 19°39′15″E
- Country: Serbia
- Region: Šumadija and Western Serbia
- District: Zlatibor
- Municipality: Čajetina

Area
  - Total: 19.90 km^{2} (7.68 sq mi)
- Elevation: 803 m (2,635 ft)

Population (2011)
  - Total: 472
  - Density: 23.7/km^{2} (61.4/sq mi)
- Time zone: UTC+1 (CET)
  - Summer (DST): UTC+2 (CEST)

Šljivovica is a village in the municipality of Čajetina, Serbia. According to the 2012 census, the village has a population of 472 inhabitants.

== Population ==
Population of Šljivovica
1948	1953	1961	1971	1981	1991	2002	2011
851	925	892	708	537	645	573	472
