= Drenovac, Kragujevac =

Drenovac Дреновац (Serbian)
- Location within Serbia
- Coordinates: 44°00′00″N 20°47′40″E
- Country: Serbia
- District: Šumadija District
- City: Kragujevac

Population (2011)
  - Total: 333
- Time zone: UTC+1 (CET)
  - Summer (DST): UTC+2 (CEST)

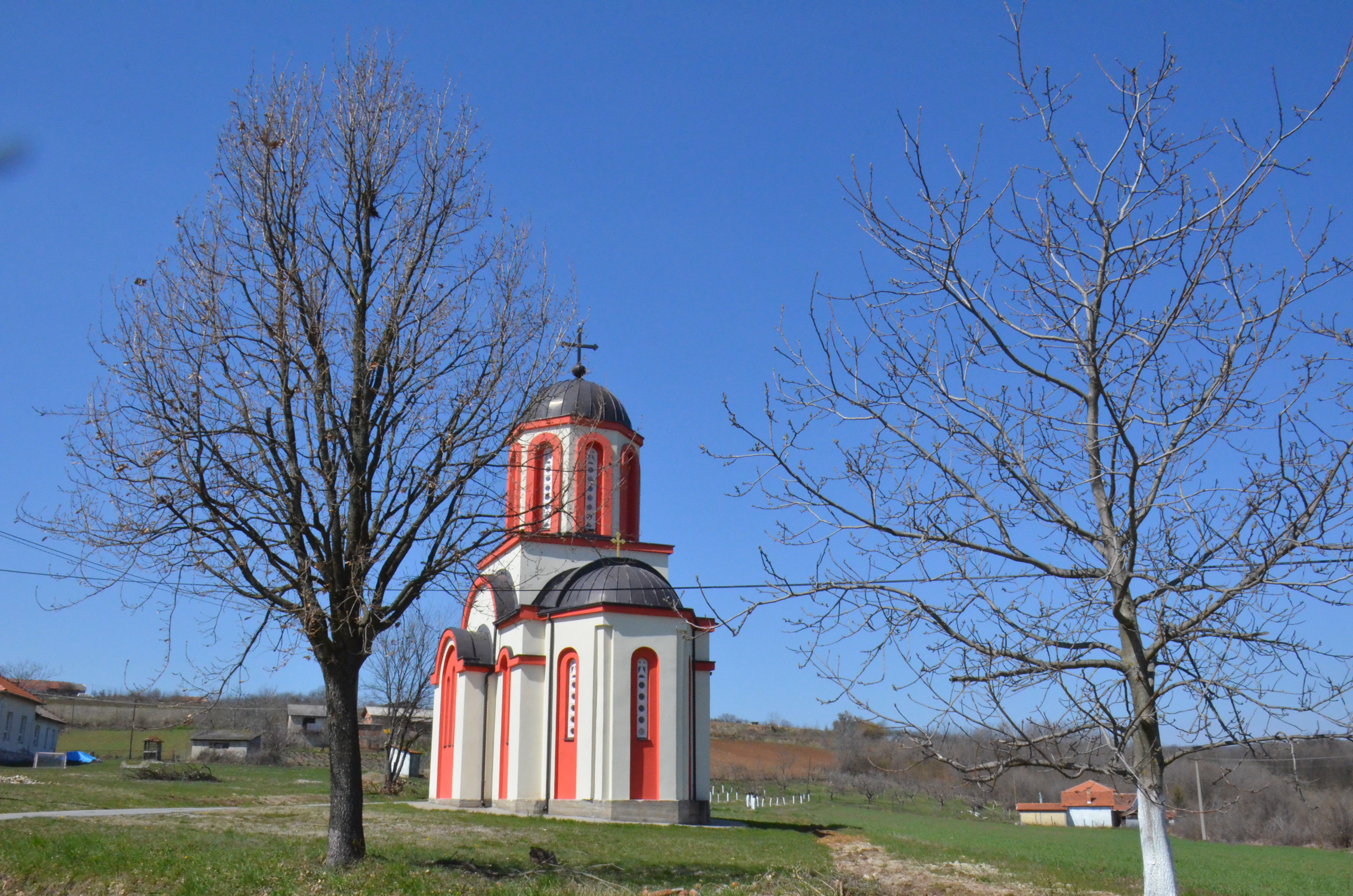
Church in Drenovac

Drenovac (Serbian: Дреновац) is a village in the city area of Kragujevac, Serbia. According to the 2011 census, the village has a population of 333 people.
