= Dražinovići =

Dražinovići Дражиновићи
- Village
- Location within Serbia
- Coordinates: 43°57′13″N 20°00′31″E
- Country: Serbia
- District: Zlatibor District
- Municipality: Požega

Area
  - Total: 8.4 km^{2} (3.2 sq mi)

Population (2022)
  - Total: 225
  - Density: 27/km^{2} (69/sq mi)
- Time zone: UTC+1 (CET)
  - Summer (DST): UTC+2 (CEST)

Dražinovići, formerly also known as Draženovići, is a village in the municipality of Požega, western Serbia. According to the 2022 census, the village has a population of 225 people.

== Geography ==
The village is located between the small rivers of Gradnje, Skrapeža and Jelava.

== History ==
It was founded in the Ottoman era and was once inhabited by the "Turk" family of Dražinovići that likely gave their name to the hamlet. It is alleged that the "Turks" were driven out by the hajduk families of Pavle and Jovan Mitrović-Demir and that their descendants live in Požega near Novi Pazar.

Jovan Mitrović-Demir (1762–1852), born in the Sanjak of Herzegovina (hailing from Piva), settled the village some time prior to the First Serbian Uprising (1804–13). It was at that time part of the Užice nahiya. Demir distinguished himself in the uprising and was ranked a buljubaša and kapetan, then retired in the village.

In the 1970s, Dražinovići was one of four hamlets part of the Ježevica village, the other being Velika Ježevica, Mala Ježevica and Mađer.

== Sources ==
- Milićević, Milan Đ. (1888). Поменик знаменитих људи у српског народа новијега доба. Издање Чупићеве задужбине. pp. 135–137 – via Archive.org.
- Српско географско друштво (1977). "Ježevice Užičke". Glasnik: Bulletin de la Société serbe de geographie. 57. Српско географско друштво: 67.
