= Zaselje (disambiguation) =

Zaselje is a village in the municipality of Požega, western Serbia.

Zaselje may also refer to:

- Zaselje, Kotor Varoš, a settlement in Kotor Varoš, Bosnia and Herzegovina
- Zaselje, Travnik, a village in Bosnia and Herzegovina
- Zaselje, Vitez, a village in Bosnia and Herzegovina
- Zaselje, Pljevlja, a small village in Montenegro
