= Požega =

Požega commonly refers to:

- Požega, Croatia, a city in western Slavonia
- Požega, Serbia, a town in Zlatibor district

Požega may also refer to:

- Požega County, a subdivision of Croatia-Slavonia from the 12th century to 1920
- Požega, Novi Pazar, a village in Raska district of Serbia
- Eparchy of Požega, an Eastern Orthodox eparchy during the 16th and 17th century
