= Tabanovići =

Tabanovići Табановићи
- Village
- Location within Serbia
- Coordinates: 43°55′01″N 20°04′43″E
- Country: Serbia
- District: Zlatibor District
- Municipality: Požega

Area
  - Total: 4.6 km^{2} (1.8 sq mi)

Population (2022)
  - Total: 107
  - Density: 23/km^{2} (60/sq mi)
- Time zone: UTC+1 (CET)
  - Summer (DST): UTC+2 (CEST)

Tabanovići is a village in the municipality of Požega, western Serbia. According to the 2022 census, the village has a population of 107 people.
