= Čestobrodica =

Čestobrodica Честобродица
- Village
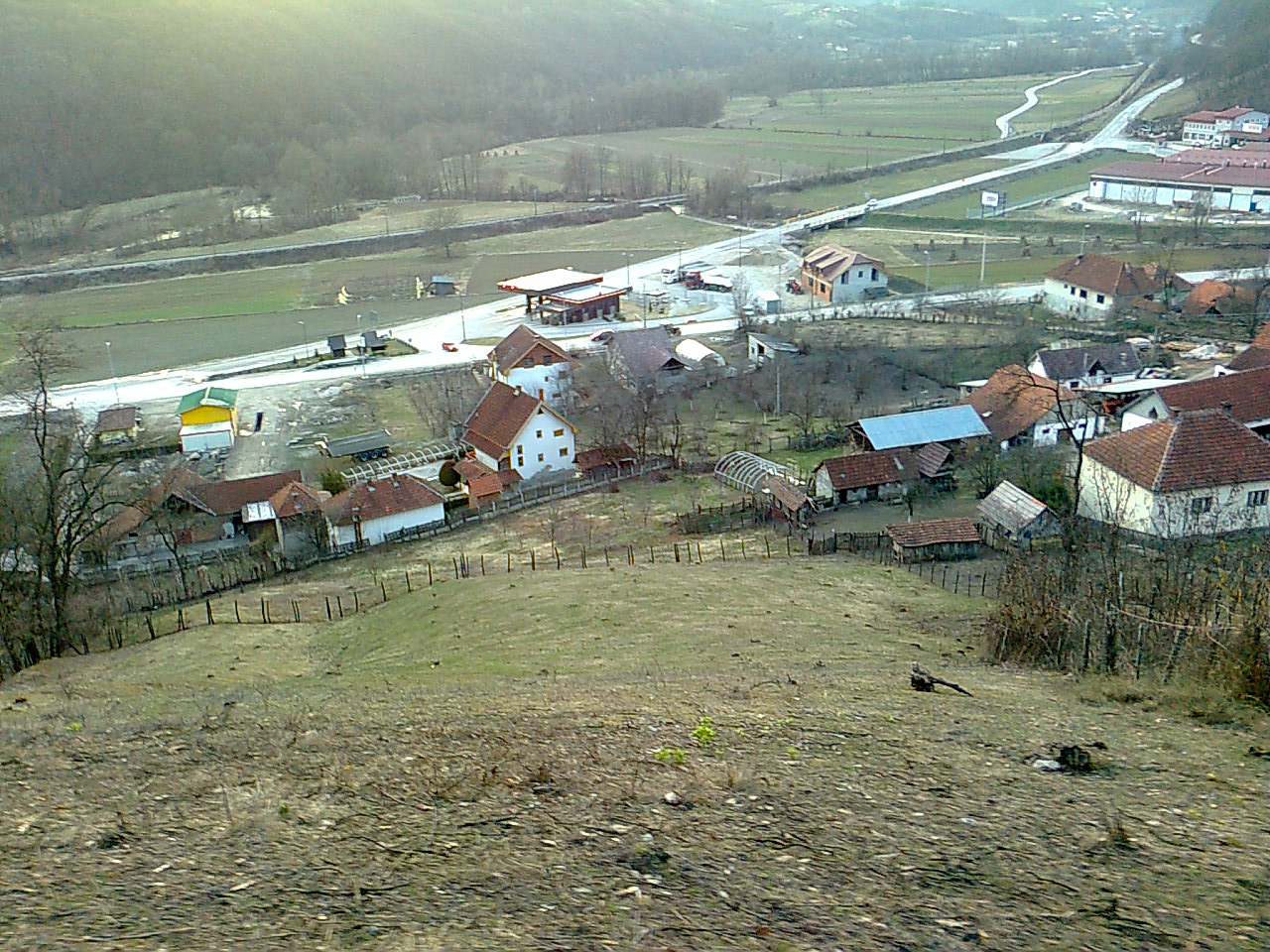

- Location within Serbia
- Coordinates: 43°54′28″N 20°00′13″E
- Country: Serbia
- District: Zlatibor District
- Municipality: Požega

Area
  - Total: 8.3 km^{2} (3.2 sq mi)

Population (2022)
  - Total: 190
  - Density: 23/km^{2} (59/sq mi)
- Time zone: UTC+1 (CET)
  - Summer (DST): UTC+2 (CEST)

Čestobrodica is a village in the municipality of Požega, westernSerbia. According to the 2022 census, the village has a population of 190 people
