= Glumač =

Glumač Глумач
- Village
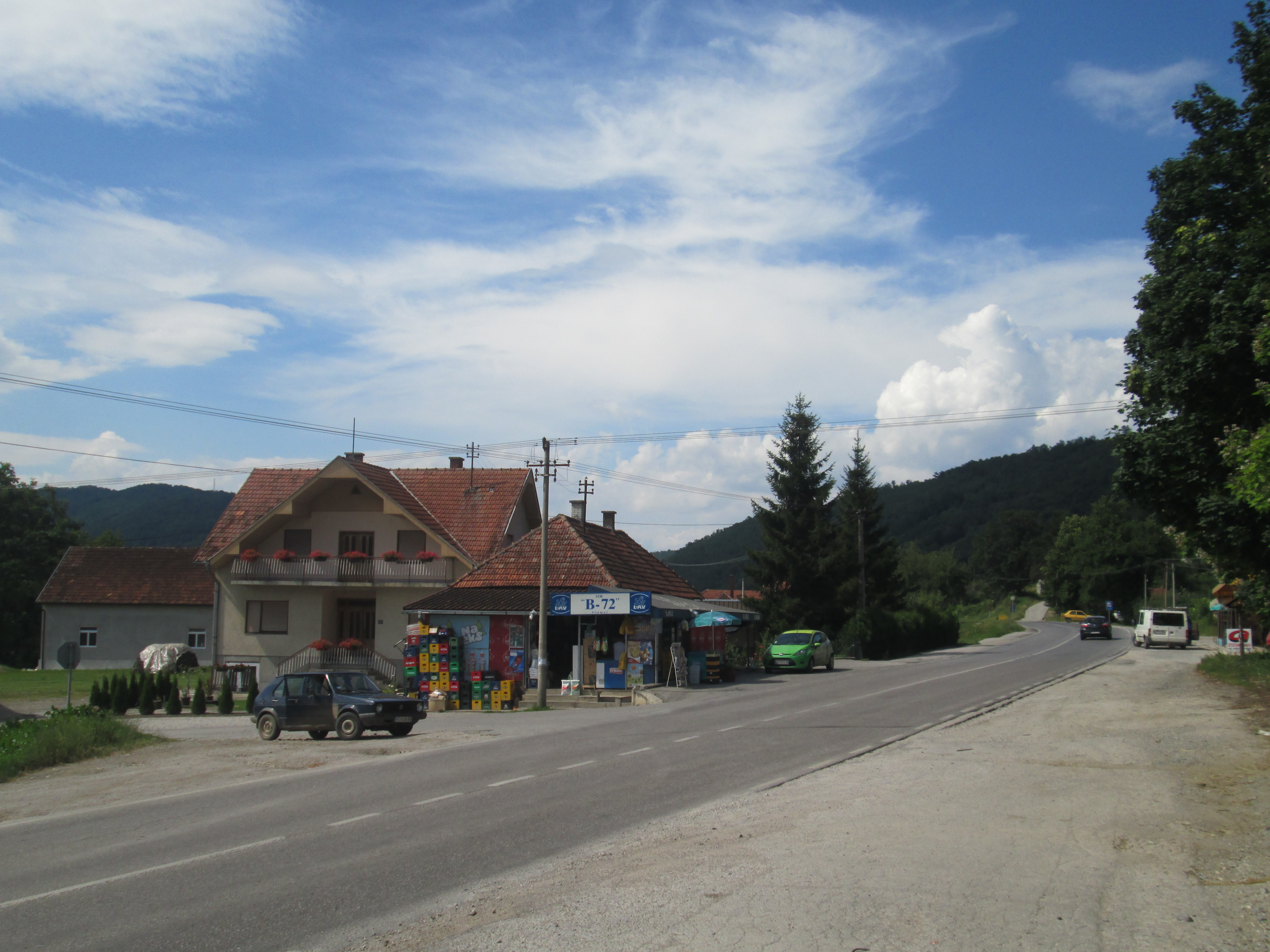
- Street in Glumac

- Location within Serbia
- Coordinates: 43°52′42″N 20°00′06″E
- Country: Serbia
- District: Zlatibor District
- Municipality: Požega

Area
  - Total: 12.3 km^{2} (4.7 sq mi)

Population (2022)
  - Total: 561
  - Density: 45.6/km^{2} (118/sq mi)
- Time zone: UTC+1 (CET)
  - Summer (DST): UTC+2 (CEST)

Glumač (Serbian Cyrillic: Глумач) is a village in the municipality of Požega, western Serbia. According to the 2022 census, the village has a population of 561 inhabitants.
