= Tučkovo =

Tučkovo Тучково
- Village
- Location within Serbia
- Coordinates: 43°53′52″N 20°08′28″E
- Country: Serbia
- District: Zlatibor District
- Municipality: Požega

Area
  - Total: 4.9 km^{2} (1.9 sq mi)

Population (2022)
  - Total: 124
  - Density: 25/km^{2} (66/sq mi)
- Time zone: UTC+1 (CET)
  - Summer (DST): UTC+2 (CEST)

Tučkovo is a village in the municipality of Požega, western Serbia. According to the 2022 census, the village has a population of 124 people.
