= Duškovci =

Duškovci Душковци
- Village
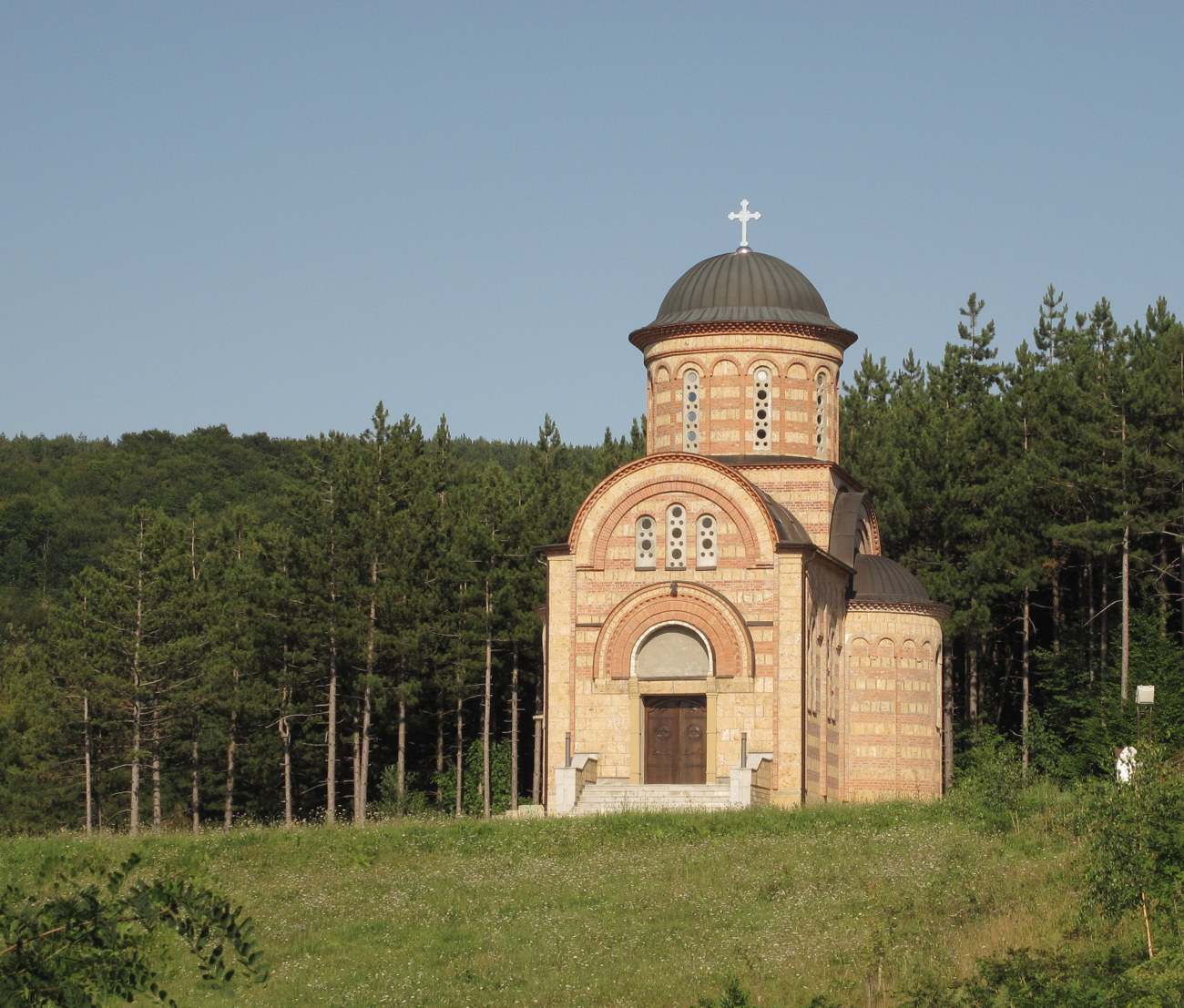
- Church of the Holy Trinity

- Location within Serbia
- Coordinates: 44°00′23″N 20°03′00″E
- Country: Serbia
- District: Zlatibor District
- Municipality: Požega

Area
  - Total: 11.1 km^{2} (4.3 sq mi)

Population (2022)
  - Total: 235
  - Density: 21.2/km^{2} (54.8/sq mi)
- Time zone: UTC+1 (CET)
  - Summer (DST): UTC+2 (CEST)

Duškovci is a village in the municipality of Požega, western Serbia. According to the 2022 census, the village has a population of 235 people.
