= Rečice =

Rečice Речице
- Village
- Location within Serbia
- Coordinates: 43°46′58″N 20°01′41″E
- Country: Serbia
- District: Zlatibor District
- Municipality: Požega

Area
  - Total: 7.6 km^{2} (2.9 sq mi)

Population (2022)
  - Total: 126
  - Density: 17/km^{2} (43/sq mi)
- Time zone: UTC+1 (CET)
  - Summer (DST): UTC+2 (CEST)

Rečice (Serbian: Речице) is a village in the municipality of Požega, western Serbia. According to the 2022 census, the village has a population of 126 people.
