= Lopaš =

Lopaš may refer to:

- Lopaš (Požega), a village in Serbia
- Lopaš (Trstenik), a village in Serbia
