= Forca Požega =

Forum of Civil Action Pozega
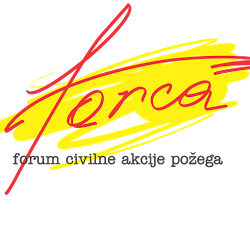
- Founded: July 1999
- Founder: Miroslav Tamburić, Goran Đukić
- Type: Non-Governmental Organisation
- Purpose: Youth
- Location: Požega, Serbia
- Employees: 5
- Website: www.forca.rs

FORCA - Forum of Civil Action Požega - is a non-profit organization founded in July 1999, and located in Požega, a town in west Serbia. At the moment, Forca represents an organisation that is highly respected in Serbia and abroad.
