= Radovci, Požega =

Radovci Радовци
- Village
- Location within Serbia
- Coordinates: 43°50′23″N 19°58′29″E
- Country: Serbia
- District: Zlatibor District
- Municipality: Požega

Area
  - Total: 5.4 km^{2} (2.1 sq mi)

Population (2022)
  - Total: 365
  - Density: 68/km^{2} (180/sq mi)
- Time zone: UTC+1 (CET)
  - Summer (DST): UTC+2 (CEST)

Radovci is a village in the municipality of Požega, western Serbia. According to the 2022 census, the village has a population of 365 people.
