= Tometino Polje =

Tometino Polje Тометино Поље
- Village
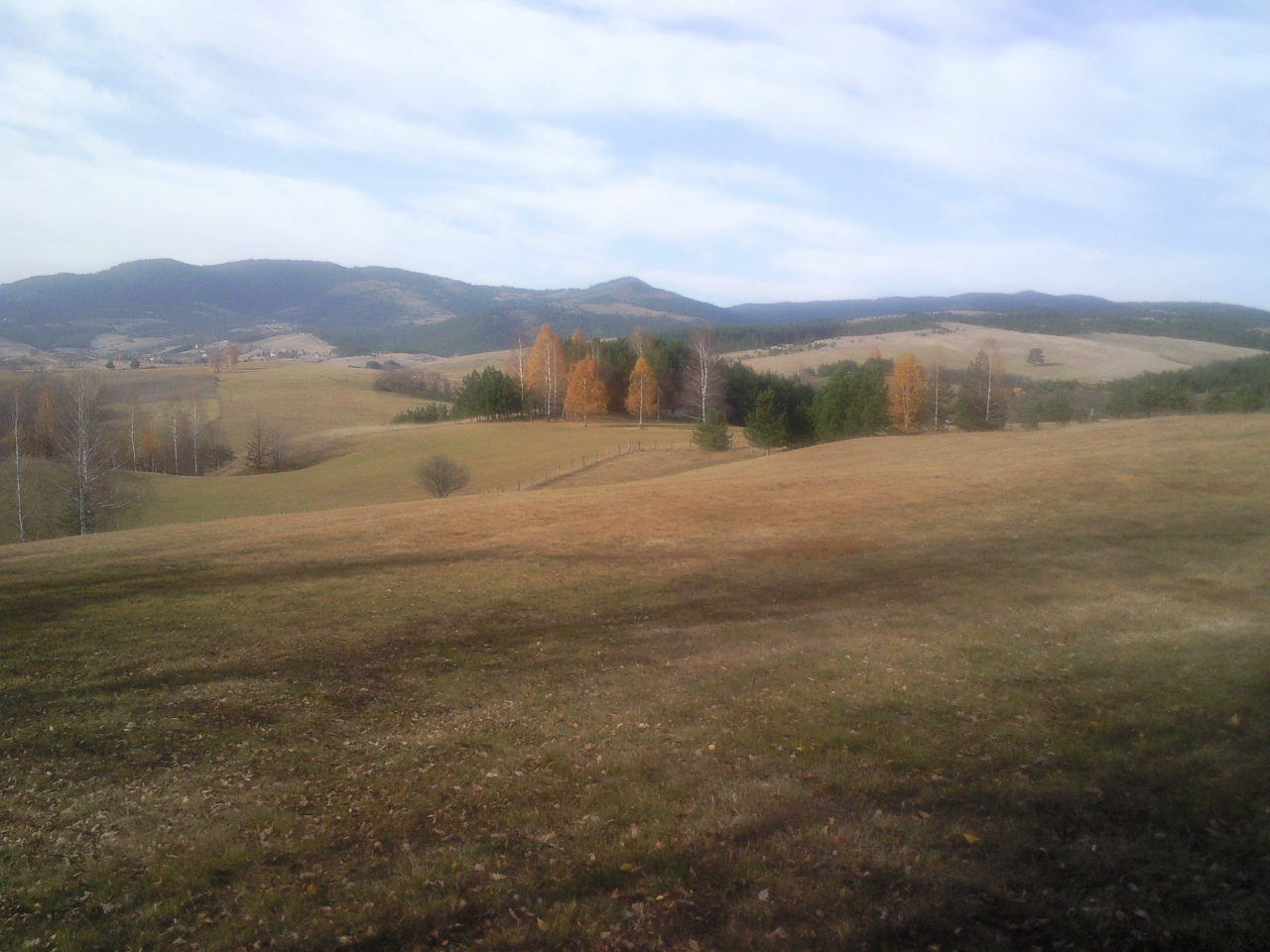

- Location within Serbia
- Coordinates: 44°04′41″N 20°01′16″E
- Country: Serbia
- District: Zlatibor District
- Municipality: Požega

Area
  - Total: 53 km^{2} (20 sq mi)

Population (2022)
  - Total: 260
  - Density: 4.9/km^{2} (13/sq mi)
- Time zone: UTC+1 (CET)
  - Summer (DST): UTC+2 (CEST)

Tometino Polje is a village in the municipality of Požega, western Serbia. According to the 2022 census, the village has a population of 260 people.
