= Prilipac =

Prilipac Прилипац
- Village
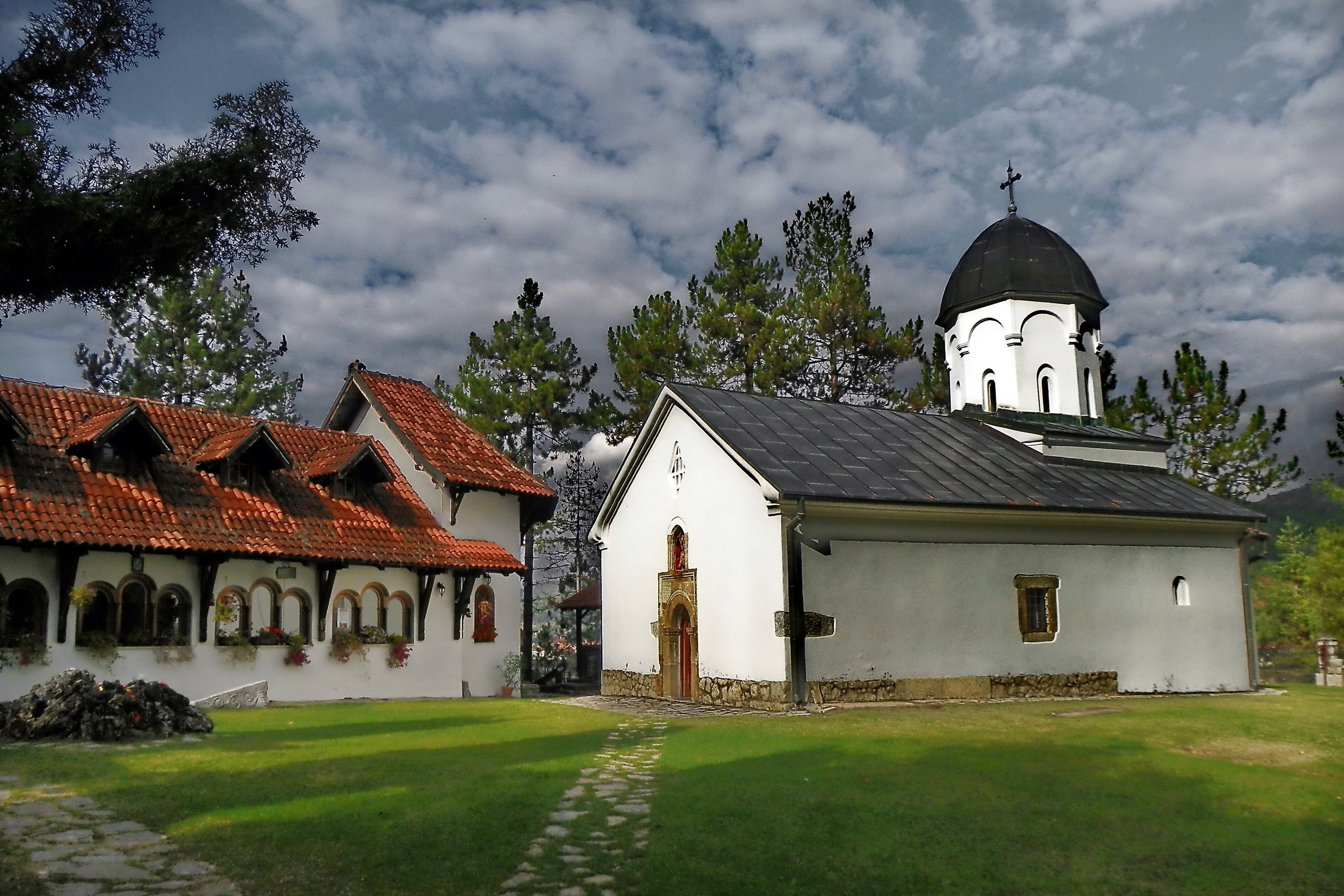
- Prilipac

- Location within Serbia
- Coordinates: 43°49′08″N 20°06′34″E
- Country: Serbia
- District: Zlatibor District
- Municipality: Požega

Area
  - Total: 3.8 km^{2} (1.5 sq mi)

Population (2022)
  - Total: 247
  - Density: 65/km^{2} (170/sq mi)
- Time zone: UTC+1 (CET)
  - Summer (DST): UTC+2 (CEST)

Prilipac (Serbian Cyrillic: Прилипац; old name Kapice, Serbian Cyrillic: Капице) is a village in the municipality of Požega, western Serbia. According to the 2022 census, the village has a population of 247 people.
