= Bakionica =

Bakionica Бакионица
- Village
- Location within Serbia
- Coordinates: 43°51′44″N 20°02′43″E
- Country: Serbia
- District: Zlatibor District
- Municipality: Požega

Area
  - Total: 6.7 km^{2} (2.6 sq mi)

Population (2022)
  - Total: 710
  - Density: 110/km^{2} (270/sq mi)
- Time zone: UTC+1 (CET)
  - Summer (DST): UTC+2 (CEST)

Bakionica is a village in the municipality of Požega, western Serbia. According to the 2022 census, the village has a population of 710 people.
