= Rasna, Požega =

Rasna Расна
- Village
- Location within Serbia
- Coordinates: 43°49′13″N 20°02′13″E
- Country: Serbia
- Region: Šumadija and Western Serbia
- District: Zlatibor
- Municipality: Požega

Area
  - Total: 6.1 km^{2} (2.4 sq mi)

Population (2022)
  - Total: 914
  - Density: 150/km^{2} (390/sq mi)
- Time zone: UTC+1 (CET)
  - Summer (DST): UTC+2 (CEST)

Rasna (Serbian Cyrillic: Расна) is a village in the municipality of Požega, western Serbia. According to the 2022 census, the village has a population of 914 inhabitants.

== Demographics ==
Population of Rasna
1948	1953	1961	1971	1981	1991	2002	2011	2022
690	721	823	860	1009	992	1026	995	914
