= Gorobilje =

Gorobilje Горобиље
- Village
- Location within Serbia
- Coordinates: 43°49′39″N 20°04′39″E
- Country: Serbia
- District: Zlatibor District
- Municipality: Požega

Area
  - Total: 14.1 km^{2} (5.4 sq mi)

Population (2022)
  - Total: 1,117
  - Density: 79.2/km^{2} (205/sq mi)
- Time zone: UTC+1 (CET)
  - Summer (DST): UTC+2 (CEST)

Gorobilje is a village in the municipality of Požega, western Serbia. According to the 2022 census, the village has a population of 1117 people. There is a Serbian Orthodox Church of Saint John the Baptist in the village square.
