= Gugalj =

Gugalj Гугаљ
- Village
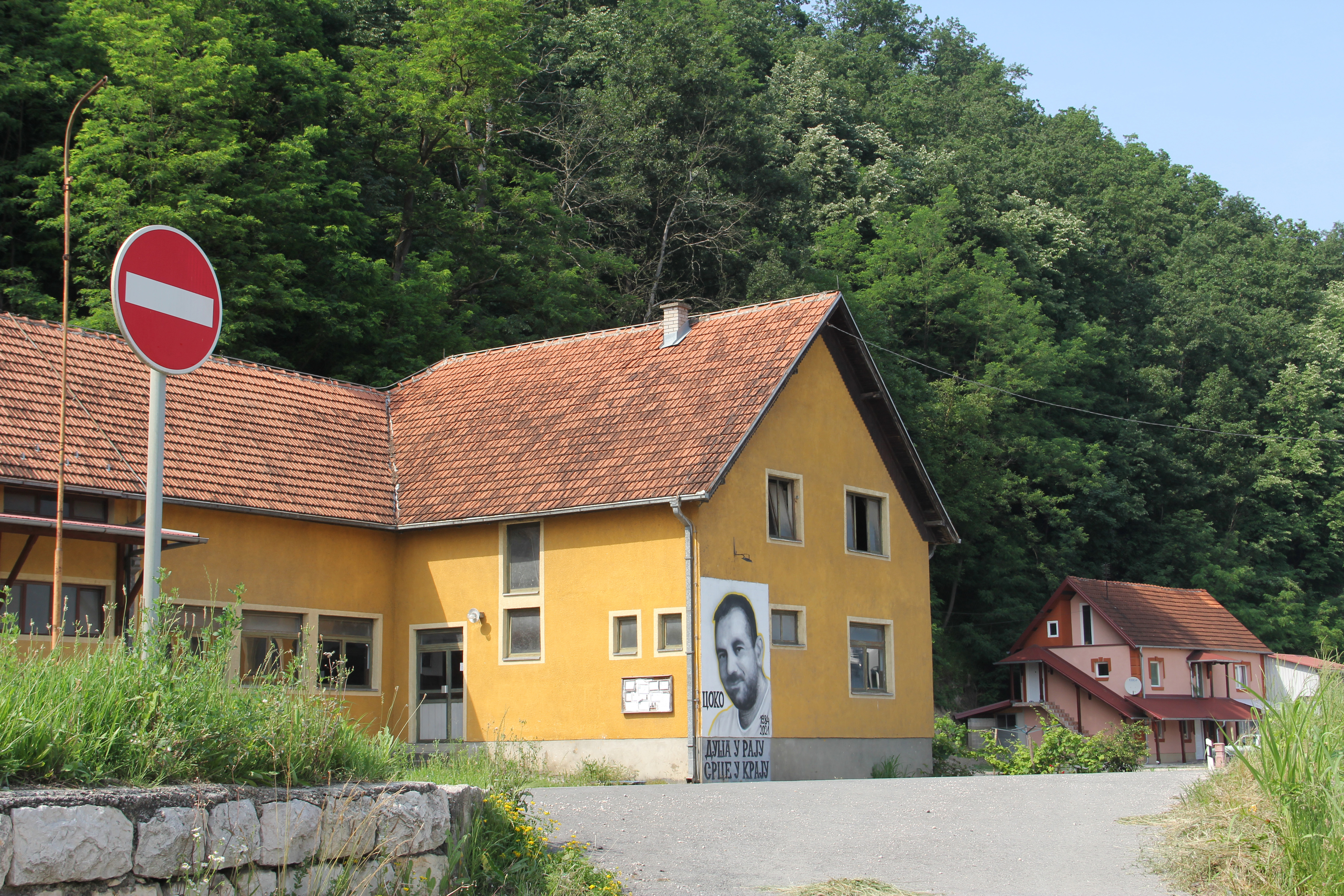

- Location within Serbia
- Coordinates: 43°52′04″N 20°05′52″E
- Country: Serbia
- District: Zlatibor District
- Municipality: Požega

Area
  - Total: 7 km^{2} (2.7 sq mi)

Population (2022)
  - Total: 179
  - Density: 26/km^{2} (66/sq mi)
- Time zone: UTC+1 (CET)
  - Summer (DST): UTC+2 (CEST)

Gugalj (Serbian Cyrillic: Гугаљ) is a village in the municipality of Požega, western Serbia. According to the 2022 census, the village has a population of 179 inhabitants.
