= Otanj =

Otanj Отањ
- Village
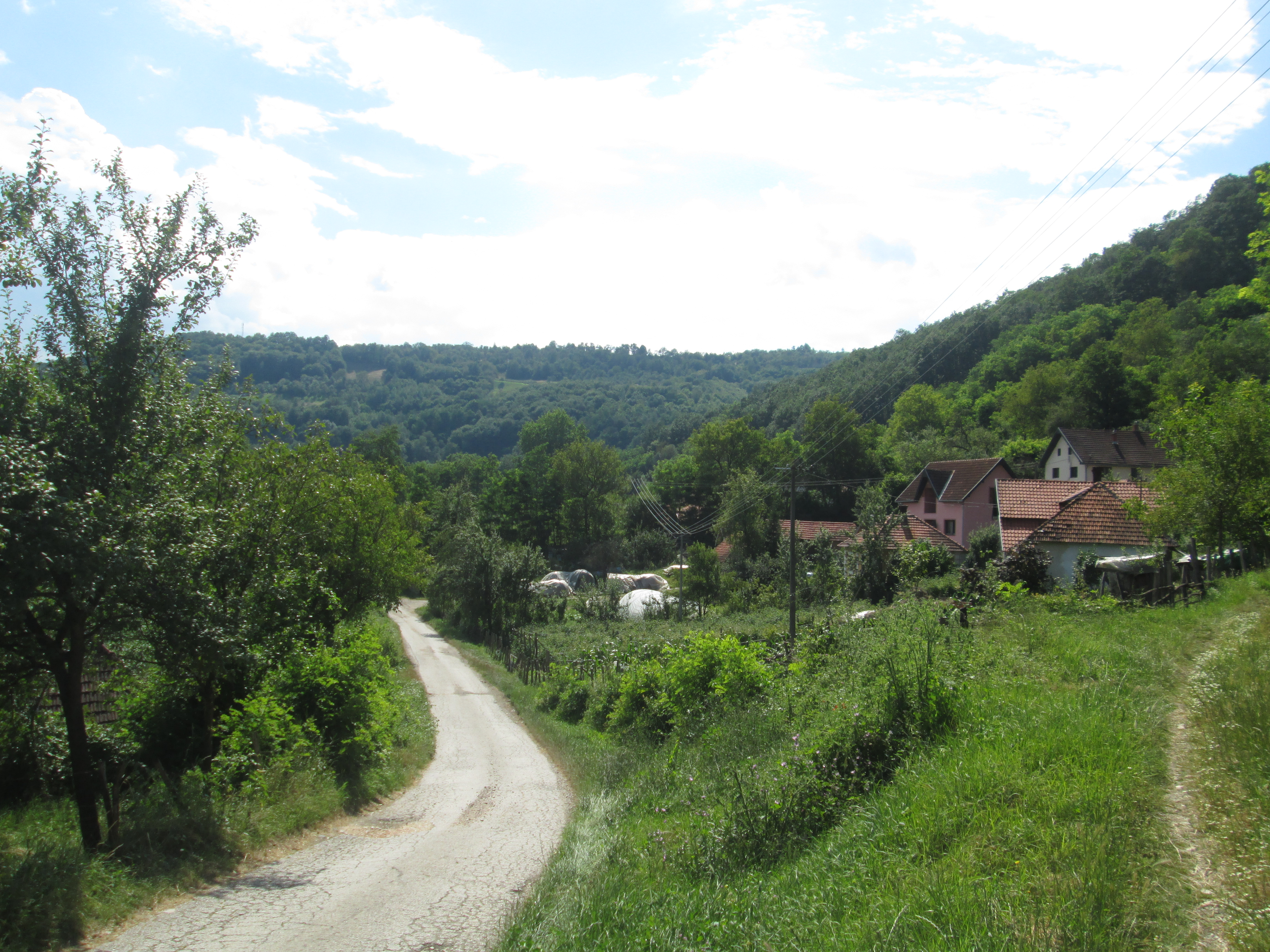
- A road towards Otanj, with some Otanj buildings in the middle ground

- Location within Serbia
- Coordinates: 43°53′39″N 19°59′08″E
- Country: Serbia
- District: Zlatibor District
- Municipality: Požega

Area
  - Total: 6.1 km^{2} (2.4 sq mi)

Population (2022)
  - Total: 278
  - Density: 46/km^{2} (120/sq mi)
- Time zone: UTC+1 (CET)
  - Summer (DST): UTC+2 (CEST)

Otanj (Serbian Cyrillic: Отањ) is a village in the municipality of Požega, western Serbia. According to the 2022 census, the village has a population of 278 inhabitants.
