= Tvrdići =

Tvrdići Тврдићи
- Village
- Location within Serbia
- Coordinates: 43°51′52″N 19°56′31″E
- Country: Serbia
- District: Zlatibor District
- Municipality: Požega

Area
  - Total: 6.4 km^{2} (2.5 sq mi)

Population (2022)
  - Total: 227
  - Density: 35/km^{2} (92/sq mi)
- Time zone: UTC+1 (CET)
  - Summer (DST): UTC+2 (CEST)

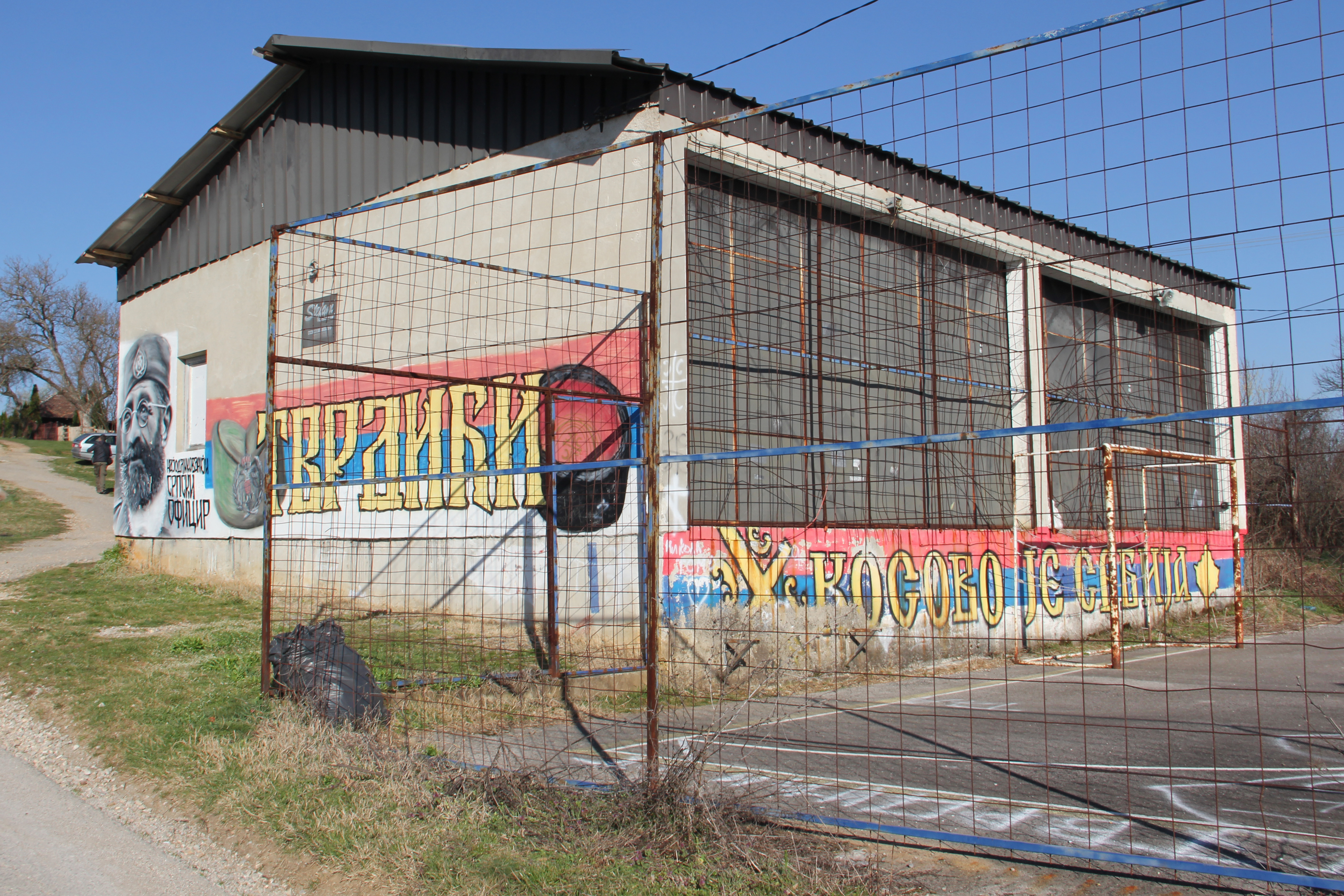
Tvrdići

Tvrdići is a village in the municipality of Požega, western Serbia. According to the 2022 census, the village has a population of 227 people.
