= Mršelji =

Mršelji Мршељи
- Village
- Location within Serbia
- Coordinates: 44°01′35″N 20°04′37″E
- Country: Serbia
- District: Zlatibor District
- Municipality: Požega

Area
  - Total: 11.5 km^{2} (4.4 sq mi)

Population (2022)
  - Total: 125
  - Density: 10.9/km^{2} (28.2/sq mi)
- Time zone: UTC+1 (CET)
  - Summer (DST): UTC+2 (CEST)

Mršelji is a village in the municipality of Požega, western Serbia. According to the 2025 census, the village has a population of 124 people.
