= Svračkovo =

Svračkovo Сврачково
- Village
- Location within Serbia
- Coordinates: 43°45′34″N 20°00′59″E
- Country: Serbia
- District: Zlatibor District
- Municipality: Požega

Area
  - Total: 11.9 km^{2} (4.6 sq mi)

Population (2022)
  - Total: 91
  - Density: 7.6/km^{2} (20/sq mi)
- Time zone: UTC+1 (CET)
  - Summer (DST): UTC+2 (CEST)

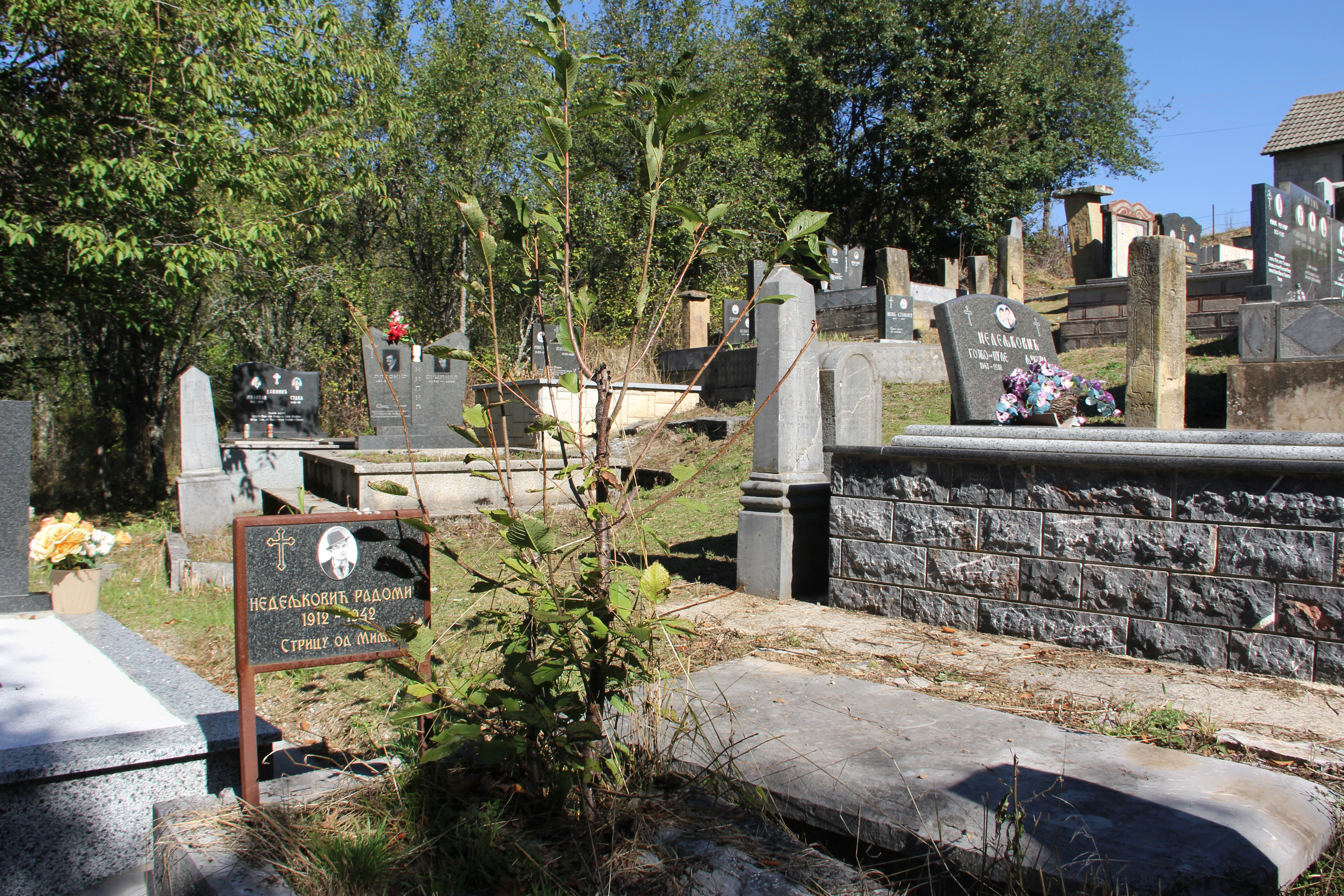
Old gravestones at the Zirave cemetery in the village of Svrackovo (Municipality of Pozega), Serbia.

Svračkovo is a village in the municipality of Požega, western Serbia. According to the 2022 census, the village has a population of 91 people.
