= Donja Dobrinja =

Donja Dobrinja Доња Добриња
- Village
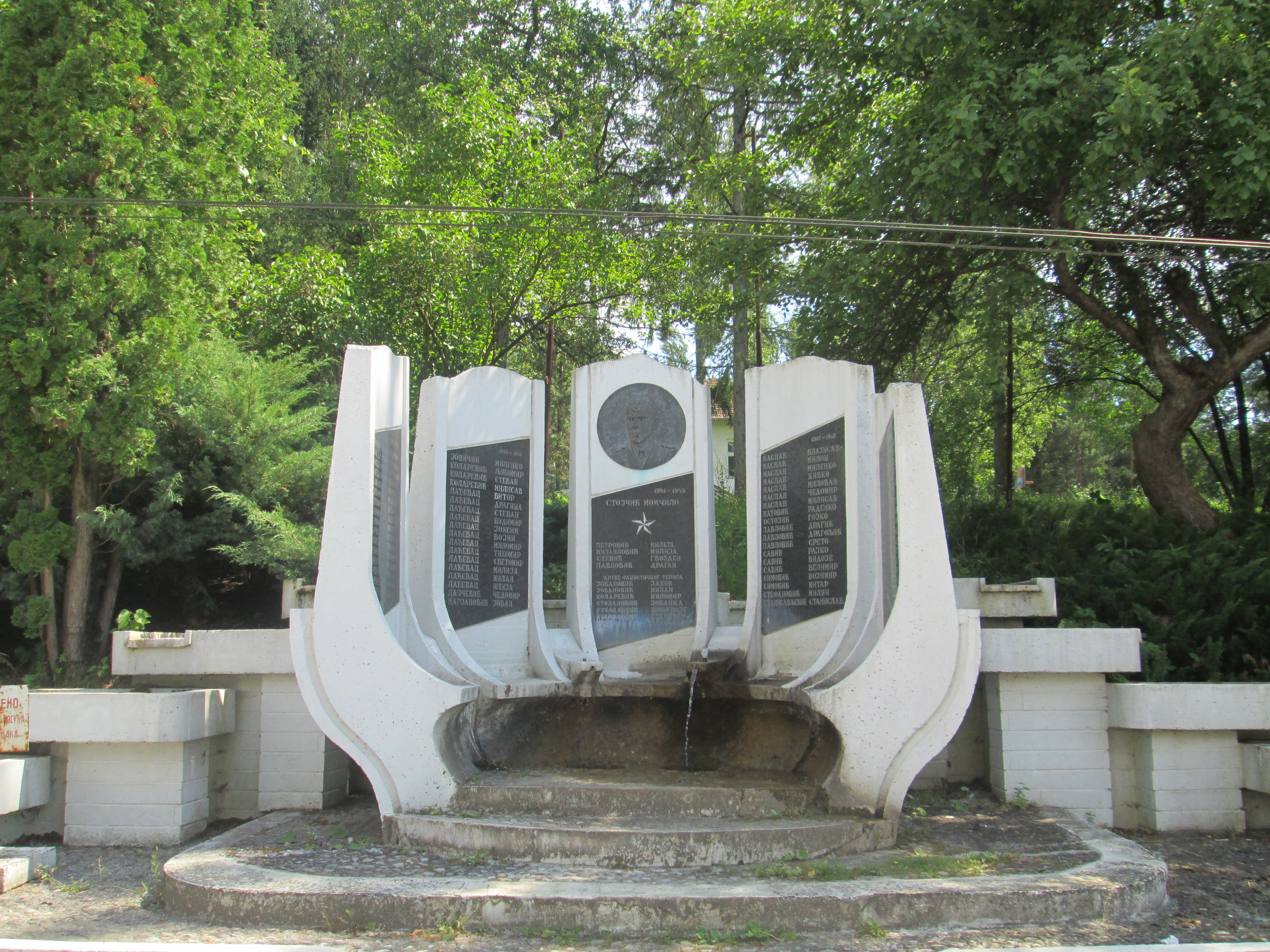
- Monument to fallen locals in the Balkan Wars and World Wars

- Location within Serbia
- Coordinates: 43°55′48″N 20°02′25″E
- Country: Serbia
- District: Zlatibor District
- Municipality: Požega

Area
  - Total: 13.1 km^{2} (5.1 sq mi)

Population (2022)
  - Total: 322
  - Density: 24.6/km^{2} (63.7/sq mi)
- Time zone: UTC+1 (CET)
  - Summer (DST): UTC+2 (CEST)

Donja Dobrinja is a village in the municipality of Požega, western Serbia. According to the 2022 census, the village has a population of 322 people.
