= Loret =

Loret Лорет
- Village
- Location within Serbia
- Coordinates: 43°53′38″N 20°03′33″E
- Country: Serbia
- District: Zlatibor District
- Municipality: Požega

Area
  - Total: 12.9 km^{2} (5.0 sq mi)

Population (2022)
  - Total: 151
  - Density: 11.7/km^{2} (30.3/sq mi)
- Time zone: UTC+1 (CET)
  - Summer (DST): UTC+2 (CEST)

Loret is a village in the municipality of Požega, western Serbia. According to the 2022 census, the village has a population of 151 people.
