= Ljutice (Požega) =

Ljutice Љутице
- Village
- Location within Serbia
- Coordinates: 44°00′50″N 20°02′27″E
- Country: Serbia
- District: Zlatibor District
- Municipality: Požega

Area
  - Total: 17.8 km^{2} (6.9 sq mi)

Population (2022)
  - Total: 274
  - Density: 15.4/km^{2} (39.9/sq mi)
- Time zone: UTC+1 (CET)
  - Summer (DST): UTC+2 (CEST)

Ljutice is a village in the municipality of Požega, western Serbia. According to the 2022 census, the village has a population of 274 people.
