= Prijanovići, Serbia =

Prijanovići Пријановићи
- Village
- Location within Serbia
- Coordinates: 43°51′09″N 20°04′30″E
- Country: Serbia
- District: Zlatibor District
- Municipality: Požega

Area
  - Total: 7.9 km^{2} (3.1 sq mi)

Population (2022)
  - Total: 313
  - Density: 40/km^{2} (100/sq mi)
- Time zone: UTC+1 (CET)
  - Summer (DST): UTC+2 (CEST)

Prijanovići (Serbian: Пријановићи) is a village in the municipality of Požega, western Serbia. According to the 2022 census, the village has a population of 313 people.
