= Jelen Do =

Jelen Do Јелен До
- Village
- Location within Serbia
- Coordinates: 43°53′26″N 20°07′05″E
- Country: Serbia
- District: Zlatibor District
- Municipality: Požega

Area
  - Total: 2.5 km^{2} (0.97 sq mi)

Population (2022)
  - Total: 76
  - Density: 30/km^{2} (79/sq mi)
- Time zone: UTC+1 (CET)
  - Summer (DST): UTC+2 (CEST)

Jelen Do is a village in the municipality of Požega, western Serbia. According to the 2022 census, the village has a population of 76 people.
