= Kalenići =

Kalenići Каленићи
- Village
- Location within Serbia
- Coordinates: 43°55′40″N 19°59′28″E
- Country: Serbia
- District: Zlatibor District
- Municipality: Požega

Area
  - Total: 8 km^{2} (3.1 sq mi)

Population (2022)
  - Total: 207
  - Density: 26/km^{2} (67/sq mi)
- Time zone: UTC+1 (CET)
  - Summer (DST): UTC+2 (CEST)

Kalenići (Serbian Cyrillic: Каленићи) is a village in the municipality of Požega, western Serbia. According to the 2022 census, the village has a population of 207 inhabitants.
