= Jovan Mitrović-Demir =

Serbian commander

- Јован Митровић-Демир
- Born: Jovan Mitrović; 1762; Sanjak of Herzegovina
- Died: 1852 (aged 89–90); Dražinovići, Principality of Serbia
- Military career
- Allegiance: Revolutionary Serbia
- Service years: 1804–1813
- Nickname: Demir ("Iron")
- Units: Ponikve, Užice
- Commands: Užice
- Conflicts: First Serbian Uprising (1804–13)

Jovan Mitrović (Serbian: Јован Митровић; 1762–1852), known by his nom de guerre Demir (Демир, "Iron" in Turkish), was a Serbian revolutionary commander active in the First Serbian Uprising (1804–1813), mostly around Užice.

Mitrović was born in the Sanjak of Herzegovina (hailing from Piva) and moved to the Sanjak of Smederevo, settling down in the village of Dražinovići in the Užice nahiya. He joined the uprising and distinguished himself, becoming the buljubaša of the Ponikve trench.

Upon hearing that an Ottoman Bosnian contingent from Sarajevo was planning to cross the Drina and attack, he gathered a band and went to Novakova pećina near Pale and preemptively attacked, destroying them and capturing some which he ransomed. This led to renown, among Serbs and "Turks" alike. He received the rank of kapetan (captain) in 1811.

With the suppression of the First Serbian Uprising in 1813 and return of Ottoman rule, Demir took to the woods as a hajduk. When Miloš Obrenović called upon him for the Second Serbian Uprising (1815), Demir immediately gathered a band which garrisoned on Tatinac above Užice, protecting the Serb villages from the Užice Turks. Following the uprising, in peacetime, he became a local politician, and is said to have had a feud with serdar Jovan Mićić from Rujan which Prince Miloš stopped. On 23 February 1836 Demir received 100 thalers pension and retired to his home in Dražinovići where he died in 1852.

== See also ==
- List of Serbian Revolutionaries
- Timeline of the Serbian Revolution

== Sources ==
- Milićević, Milan Đ. (1888). Поменик знаменитих људи у српског народа новијега доба. Издање Чупићеве задужбине. pp. 135–137 – via Archive.org.
- Nenadović, Konstantin N. (1884). Живот и дела великог Ђорђа Петровића Кара-Ђорђа. Vol. II (1 ed.). Vienna: У Штампарији Јована Н. Вернаја – via Google Books.
- Teinović, Bratislav (2020). "Преглед српско-турског ратовања на Дрини (1804-1815)". Vojnoistorijski glasnik. 2: 9–35.
- Српско географско друштво (1977). "Ježevice Užičke". Glasnik: Bulletin de la Société serbe de geographie. 57. Српско географско друштво: 67.
