= Zaselje =

Zaselje Засеље
- Village
- Location within Serbia
- Coordinates: 43°55′06″N 19°59′16″E
- Country: Serbia
- District: Zlatibor District
- Municipality: Požega

Area
  - Total: 13.3 km^{2} (5.1 sq mi)

Population (2022)
  - Total: 280
  - Density: 21/km^{2} (55/sq mi)
- Time zone: UTC+1 (CET)
  - Summer (DST): UTC+2 (CEST)

Zaselje is a village in the municipality of Požega, western Serbia. According to the 2022 census, the village has a population of 280 people.
