= Velika Ježevica =

Velika Ježevica Велика Јежевица
- Village
- Interactive map of Velika Ježevica
- Location within Serbia
- Coordinates: 43°57′57″N 20°01′28″E
- Country: Serbia
- District: Zlatibor District
- Municipality: Požega

Area
  - Total: 5.9 km^{2} (2.3 sq mi)

Population (2022)
  - Total: 269
  - Density: 46/km^{2} (120/sq mi)
- Time zone: UTC+1 (CET)
  - Summer (DST): UTC+2 (CEST)
- Postal code: 31213

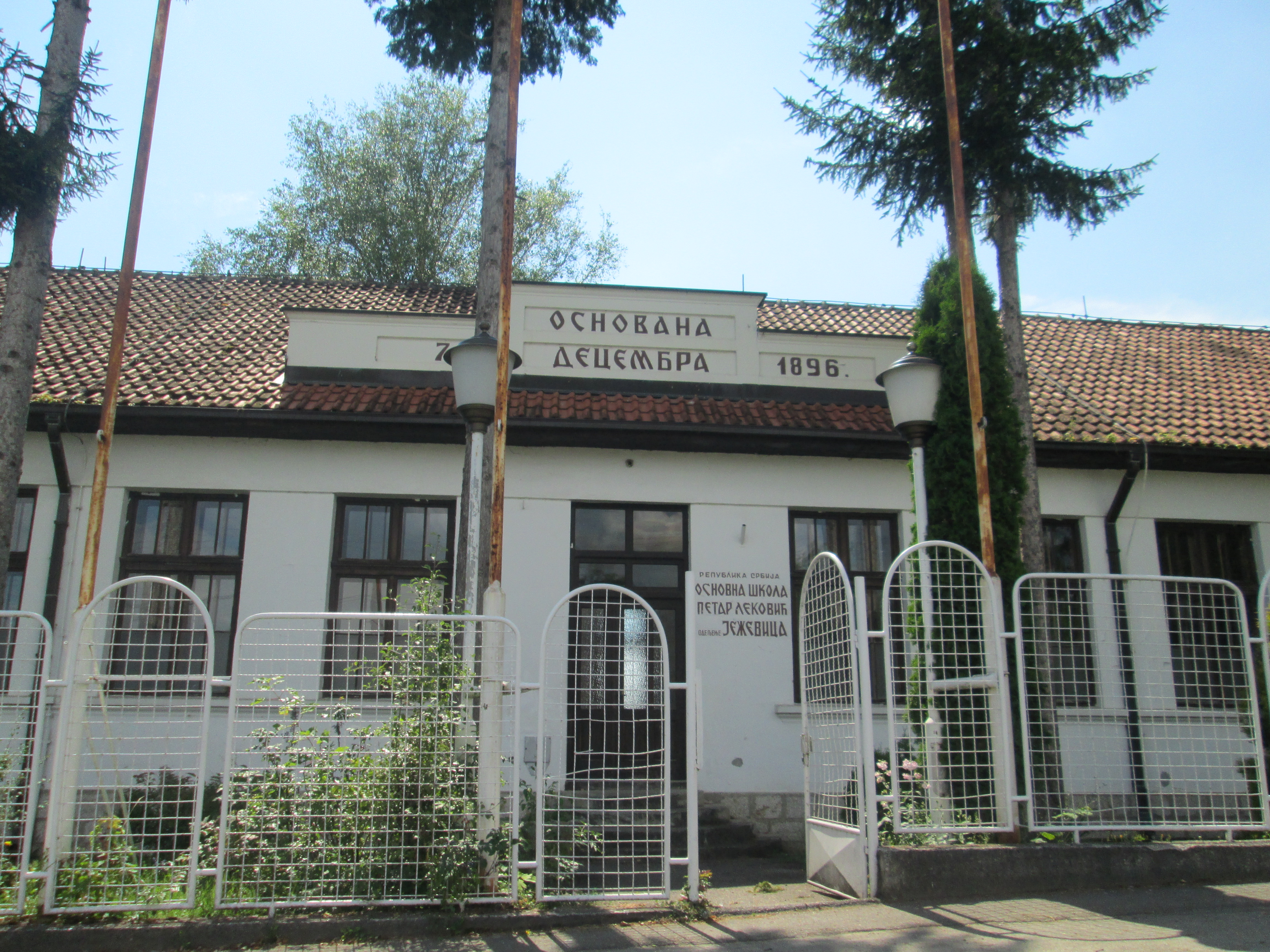
Primary school "Petar Leković", Velika Ježevica.

Velika Ježevica is a village in the municipality of Požega, western Serbia. According to the 2022 census, the village has a population of 269 people.
