= Mađer =

Mađer Мађер
- Village
- Location within Serbia
- Coordinates: 43°56′42″N 20°02′14″E
- Country: Serbia
- District: Zlatibor District
- Municipality: Požega

Area
  - Total: 4.5 km^{2} (1.7 sq mi)
- Elevation: 1,038 m (3,406 ft)

Population (2022)
  - Total: 77
  - Density: 17/km^{2} (44/sq mi)
- Time zone: UTC+1 (CET)
  - Summer (DST): UTC+2 (CEST)

Mađer is a village in the municipality of Požega, western Serbia. According to the 2022 census, the village has a population of 77 people.
