= Tatinac =

Tatinac was a village above Užice in central Serbia.

The village was used as a base for Jovan Mitrović-Demir's unit during the Second Serbian Uprising (1815), to protect the Serb villages from the Užice "Turks".

It was a site of engagements in World War II in Yugoslavia. A Chetnik unit (četa) was established here on 28 July 1941.
