= Mala Ježevica =

Mala Ježevica Мала Јежевица
- Village
- Location within Serbia
- Coordinates: 43°57′42″N 20°03′08″E
- Country: Serbia
- District: Zlatibor District
- Municipality: Požega

Area
  - Total: 7.1 km^{2} (2.7 sq mi)

Population (2022)
  - Total: 175
  - Density: 25/km^{2} (64/sq mi)
- Time zone: UTC+1 (CET)
  - Summer (DST): UTC+2 (CEST)

Mala Ježevica is a village in the municipality of Požega, western Serbia. According to the 2022 census, the village has a population of 175 people.
