= Lopaš (Požega) =

Lopaš Лопаш
- Village
- Location within Serbia
- Coordinates: 43°48′24″N 20°07′48″E
- Country: Serbia
- District: Zlatibor District
- Municipality: Požega

Area
  - Total: 10.1 km^{2} (3.9 sq mi)

Population (2022)
  - Total: 414
  - Density: 41.0/km^{2} (106/sq mi)
- Time zone: UTC+1 (CET)
  - Summer (DST): UTC+2 (CEST)

Lopaš is a village in the municipality of Požega, western Serbia. According to the 2022 census, the village has a population of 414 people.
