= Zaselje, Vitez =

Zaselje
- Village
- Location within Bosnia and Herzegovina
- Coordinates: 44.1394347°N 17.7052731°E
- Country: Bosnia and Herzegovina
- Entity: Federation of Bosnia and Herzegovina
- Canton: Central Bosnia
- Municipality: Vitez

Area
  - Total: 3.10 sq mi (8.02 km^{2})

Population (2013)
  - Total: 71
  - Density: 23/sq mi (8.9/km^{2})
- Time zone: UTC+1 (CET)
  - Summer (DST): UTC+2 (CEST)

Zaselje is a village in the municipality of Vitez, Bosnia and Herzegovina.

== Demographics ==
According to the 2013 census, its population was 71.

Ethnicity in 2013
Ethnicity	Number	Percentage
Croats	67	94.4%
Serbs	4	5.6%
Total	71	100%
