= Zaselje, Travnik =

Zaselje
- Village
- Location within Bosnia and Herzegovina
- Coordinates: 44.1394347°N 17.7052731°E
- Country: Bosnia and Herzegovina
- Entity: Federation of Bosnia and Herzegovina
- Canton: Central Bosnia
- Municipality: Travnik

Area
  - Total: 5.89 sq mi (15.26 km^{2})

Population (2013)
  - Total: 0
  - Density: 0.0/sq mi (0.0/km^{2})
- Time zone: UTC+1 (CET)
  - Summer (DST): UTC+2 (CEST)

Zaselje is a village in the municipality of Travnik, Bosnia and Herzegovina.

== Demographics ==
According to the 2013 census, its population was nil, down from 60 in 1991.
