= Požega, Novi Pazar =

Village in Raška, Serbia

Coordinates: 43°09′N 20°25′E

Požega is a small village near Novi Pazar in Raška District, Serbia. According to the 2002 census, the population was 523 people. A tributary of the Raska Ljudska flows through Požega.
