= Požega, Serbia =

Požega Пожега
- Town and municipality
- Град Пожега; Grad Požega; City of Požega
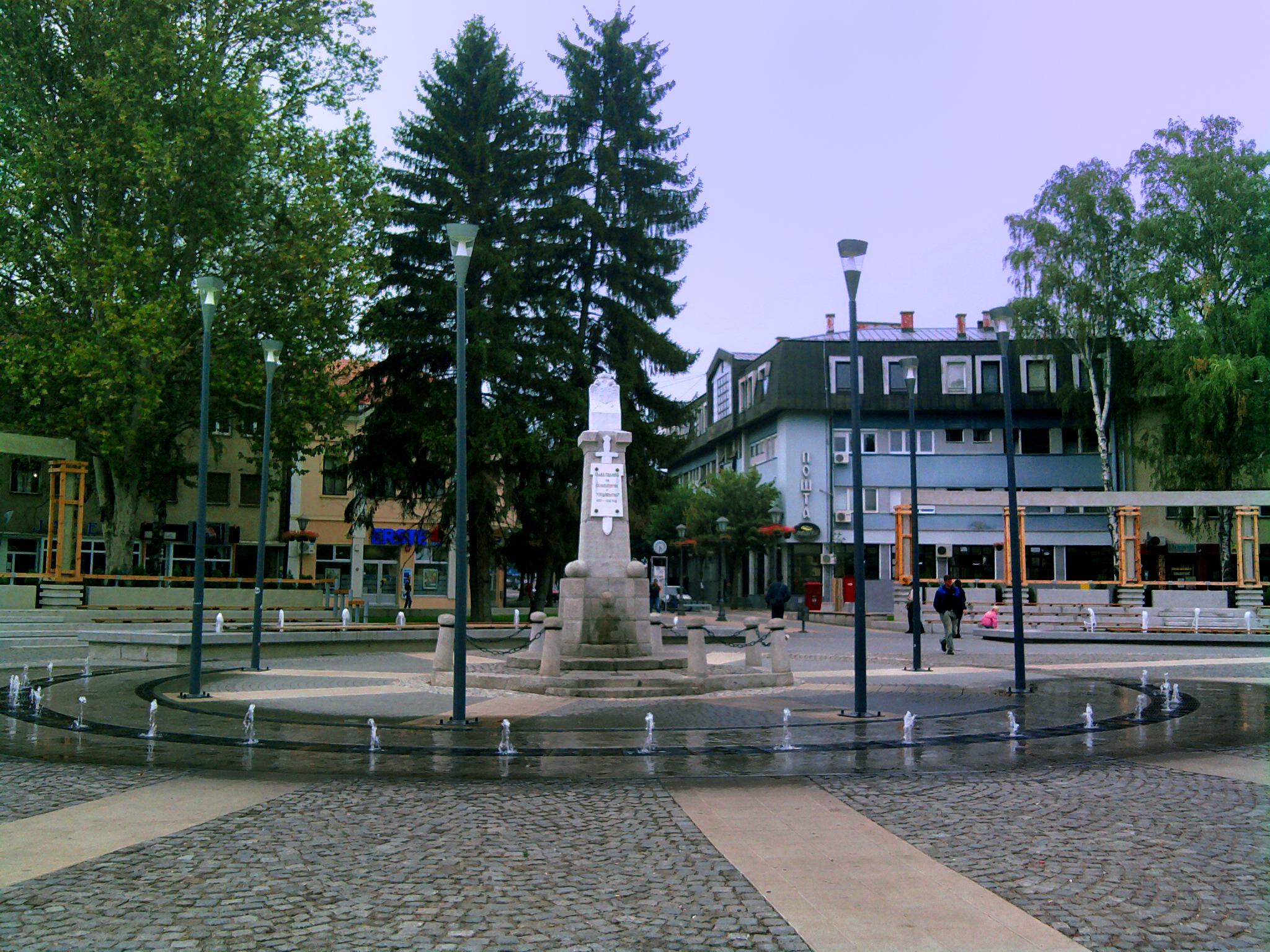
- Požega town center

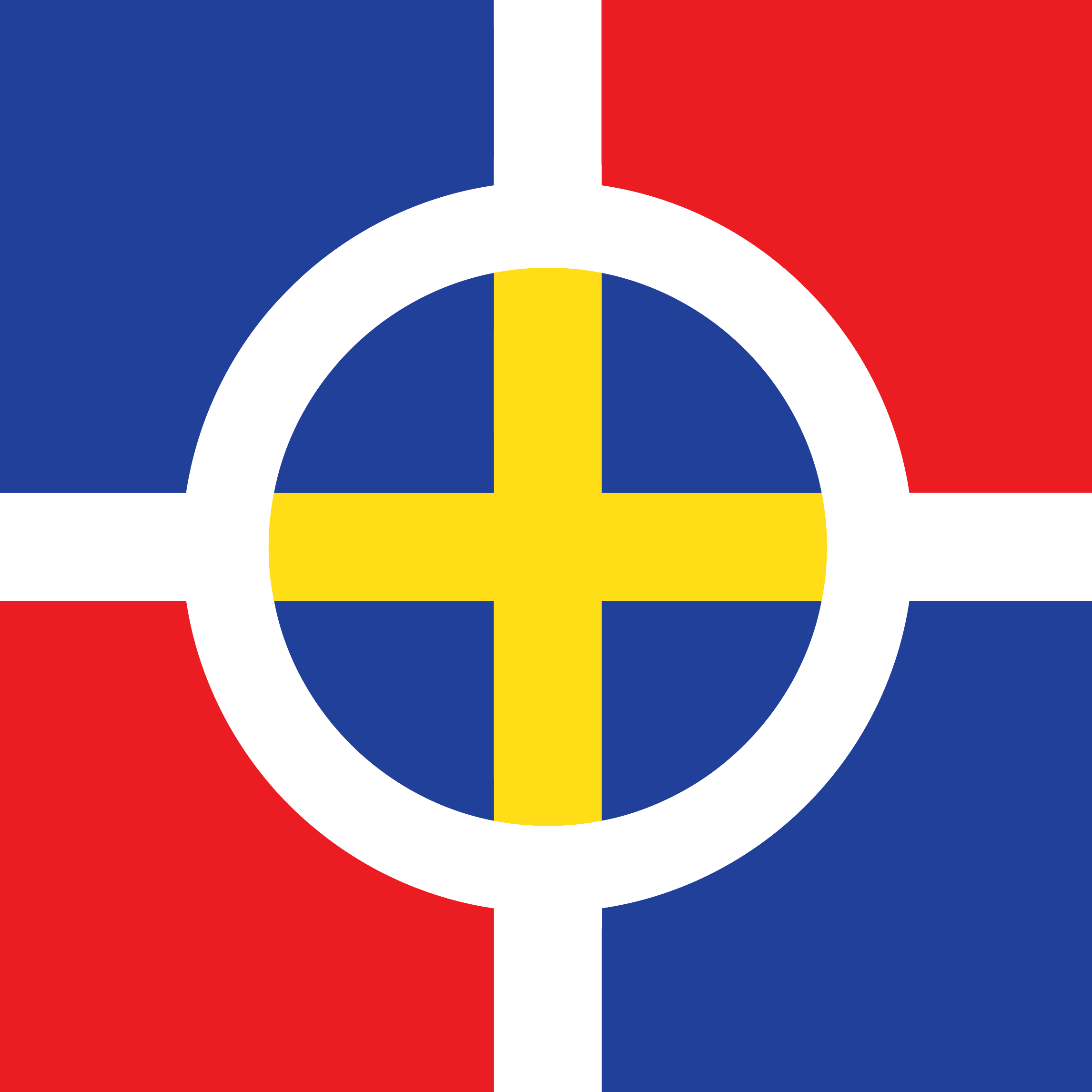
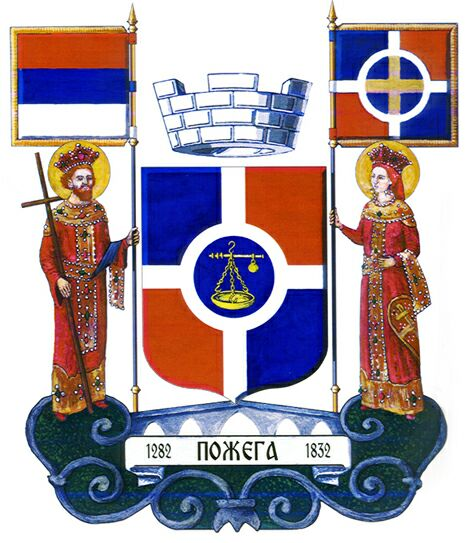
- Flag Coat of arms

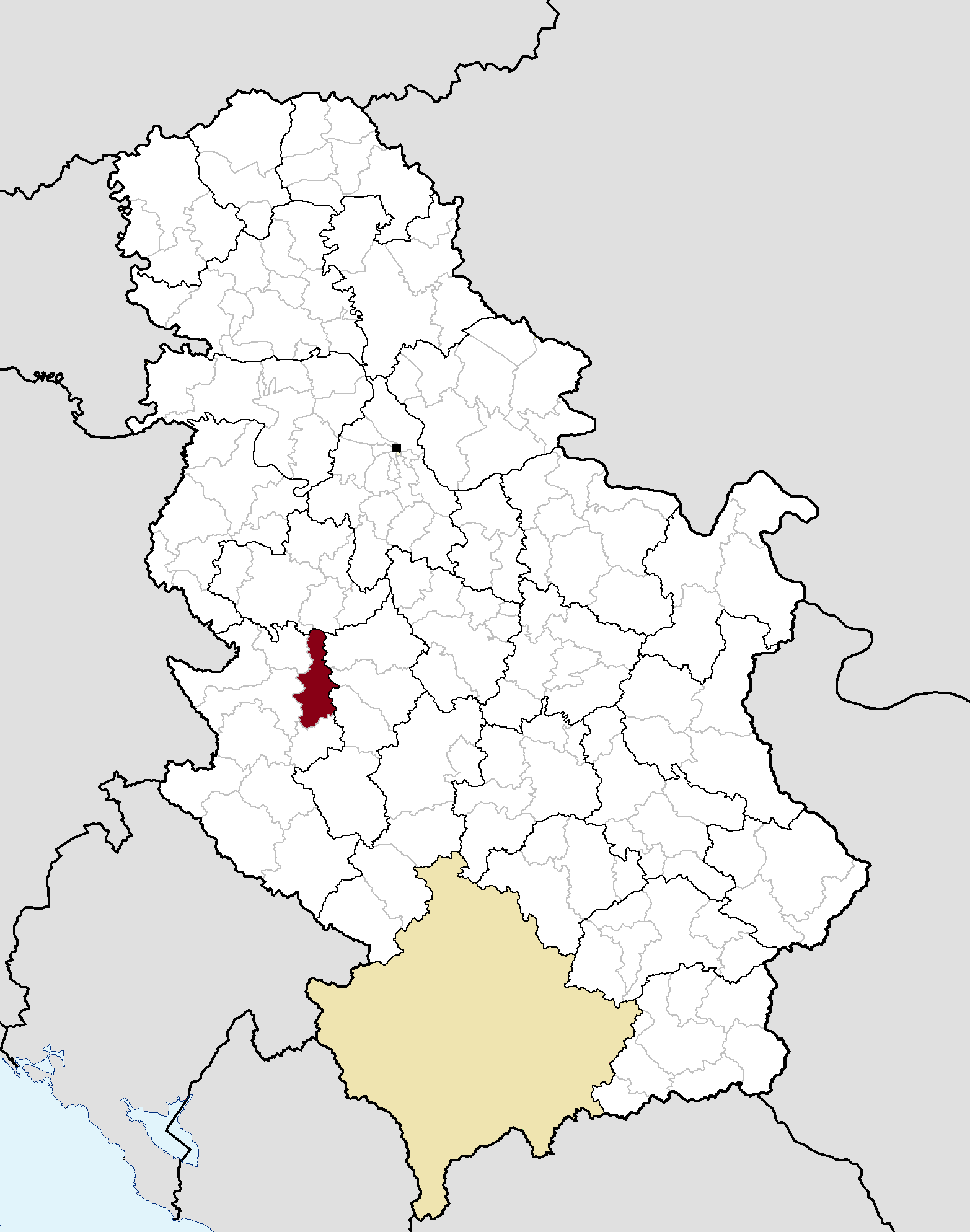
- Location of the municipality of Požega within Serbia
- Coordinates: 43°50′46″N 20°02′08″E
- Country: Serbia
- Region: Šumadija and Western Serbia
- District: Zlatibor
- Settlements: 42

Government
  - Mayor: Đorđe Nikitović (SNS)

Area
  - Town: 12 km^{2} (4.6 sq mi)
  - Municipality: 426.1 km^{2} (164.5 sq mi)
- Elevation: 315 m (1,033 ft)

Population (2022 census)
  - Town: 12,362
  - Town density: 1,000/km^{2} (2,700/sq mi)
  - Municipality: 25,988
  - Municipality density: 60.99/km^{2} (158.0/sq mi)
- Time zone: UTC+1 (CET)
  - Summer (DST): UTC+2 (CEST)
- Postal code: 31210
- Area code: +381(0)31
- Car plates: PŽ
- Website: www.pozega.org.rs

Požega (Serbian Cyrillic: Пожега, pronounced [pôʒeɡa]), formerly Užička Požega (Serbian Cyrillic: Ужичка Пожега), is a town and municipality located in the Zlatibor District of western Serbia. The population of the town is 12,362, while the municipality has 25,988 inhabitants.

== Settlements ==
Aside from the town of Požega, the municipality includes the following settlements:

- Bakionica
- Velika Ježevica
- Visibaba
- Vranjani
- Glumač
- Godovik
- Gornja Dobrinja
- Gorobilje
- Gugalj
- Donja Dobrinja
- Dražinovići
- Duškovci
- Zaselje
- Zdravčići
- Jelen Do
- Kalenići
- Lopaš
- Loret
- Ljutice
- Mađer
- Mala Ježevica
- Milićevo Selo
- Mršelji
- Otanj
- Papratište
- Pilatovići
- Prijanovići
- Prilipac
- Radovci
- Rasna
- Rečice
- Roge
- Rupeljevo
- Svračkovo
- Srednja Dobrinja
- Tabanovići
- Tvrdići
- Tometino Polje
- Tučkovo
- Uzići
- Čestobrodica

== Demographics ==
Historical population
Year	Pop.	±% p.a.
1948	31,014	—
1953	31,741	+0.46%
1961	32,382	+0.25%
1971	33,804	+0.43%
1981	34,100	+0.09%
1991	33,578	−0.15%
2002	32,293	−0.35%
2011	29,638	−0.95%
2022	25,988	−1.19%

According to the 2011 census results, the municipality of Požega has a population of 29,638 inhabitants.

=== Ethnic groups ===
The ethnic composition of the town:

Ethnic group	Population	%
Serbs	12,698	96.54%
Romani	226	1.72%
Montenegrins	51	0.39%
Croats	19	0.14%
Yugoslavs	19	0.14%
Macedonians	16	0.12%
Others	124	0.94%
Total	13,153	

== Economy ==
The following table gives a preview of total number of registered people employed in legal entities per their core activity (as of 2022):

Activity	Total
Agriculture, forestry and fishing	49
Mining and quarrying	58
Manufacturing	3,575
Electricity, gas, steam and air conditioning supply	50
Water supply; sewerage, waste management and remediation activities	156
Construction	465
Wholesale and retail trade, repair of motor vehicles and motorcycles	1,280
Transportation and storage	761
Accommodation and food services	306
Information and communication	62
Financial and insurance activities	81
Real estate activities	14
Professional, scientific and technical activities	247
Administrative and support service activities	76
Public administration and defense; compulsory social security	362
Education	560
Human health and social work activities	351
Arts, entertainment and recreation	73
Other service activities	138
Individual agricultural workers	246
Total	8,911

== Transportation ==
Požega is one of the main road and railway transportation centers in Western Serbia. It is located on the crossroads of the most important state roads in Western Serbia – State Road 21 and State Road 23. Also, a section of A2 motorway which is under construction passes through Požega. Also, it is a transportation hub between Kraljevo-Čačak-Užice railway and Belgrade–Bar railway.

== Climate ==
Požega has a humid continental climate (Köppen climate classification: Dfb) with warm summers, and cold, snowy winters. With 124 days of fog a year, and only 1594 hours of sunshine, it is amongst the foggiest and least sunny towns in Serbia.

Climate data for Požega, elevation: 310 m or 1,020 ft, 1991–2020 normals, extremes 1961–2020
Month	Jan	Feb	Mar	Apr	May	Jun	Jul	Aug	Sep	Oct	Nov	Dec	Year
Record high °C (°F)	20.6 (69.1)	24.4 (75.9)	28.8 (83.8)	32.0 (89.6)	35.6 (96.1)	37.0 (98.6)	41.0 (105.8)	39.6 (103.3)	37.3 (99.1)	32.5 (90.5)	27.6 (81.7)	23.0 (73.4)	41.0 (105.8)
Mean daily maximum °C (°F)	3.2 (37.8)	7.4 (45.3)	12.7 (54.9)	18.0 (64.4)	22.5 (72.5)	26.1 (79.0)	28.1 (82.6)	28.5 (83.3)	23.1 (73.6)	17.7 (63.9)	10.5 (50.9)	3.8 (38.8)	16.8 (62.2)
Daily mean °C (°F)	−1.3 (29.7)	1.0 (33.8)	5.7 (42.3)	10.6 (51.1)	15.2 (59.4)	19.0 (66.2)	20.5 (68.9)	20.1 (68.2)	15.4 (59.7)	10.4 (50.7)	4.9 (40.8)	−0.1 (31.8)	10.1 (50.2)
Mean daily minimum °C (°F)	−4.7 (23.5)	−3.6 (25.5)	−0.1 (31.8)	4.1 (39.4)	8.9 (48.0)	12.9 (55.2)	14.0 (57.2)	13.8 (56.8)	10.2 (50.4)	5.9 (42.6)	1.1 (34.0)	−3.0 (26.6)	5.0 (41.0)
Record low °C (°F)	−30.7 (−23.3)	−27.5 (−17.5)	−20.2 (−4.4)	−9.4 (15.1)	−1.3 (29.7)	2.8 (37.0)	4.1 (39.4)	3.8 (38.8)	−2.4 (27.7)	−7.5 (18.5)	−18.4 (−1.1)	−27.2 (−17.0)	−30.7 (−23.3)
Average precipitation mm (inches)	41.1 (1.62)	46.1 (1.81)	52.7 (2.07)	60.1 (2.37)	82.2 (3.24)	89.1 (3.51)	81.3 (3.20)	62.8 (2.47)	64.4 (2.54)	60.6 (2.39)	54.3 (2.14)	54.3 (2.14)	749.0 (29.49)
Average precipitation days (≥ 0.1 mm)	13.2	12.8	12.4	12.5	14.6	13.4	11.1	9.2	10.8	10.9	11.5	13.6	146.0
Average snowy days	8.6	7.6	5.0	1.2	0.0	0.0	0.0	0.0	0.0	0.2	2.6	6.8	32.0
Average relative humidity (%)	87.0	81.0	74.3	72.1	74.8	75.0	74.3	74.9	79.1	82.6	85.8	88.3	79.1
Mean monthly sunshine hours	47.2	76.9	124.7	148.0	178.5	208.1	241.6	227.7	149.7	98.7	57.4	35.2	1,593.7
Source: Republic Hydrometeorological Service of Serbia

== Media ==
Požega has several media with a local coverage:

- TV Stations: TV Požega
- Radio Stations: Radio Požega

== Gallery ==
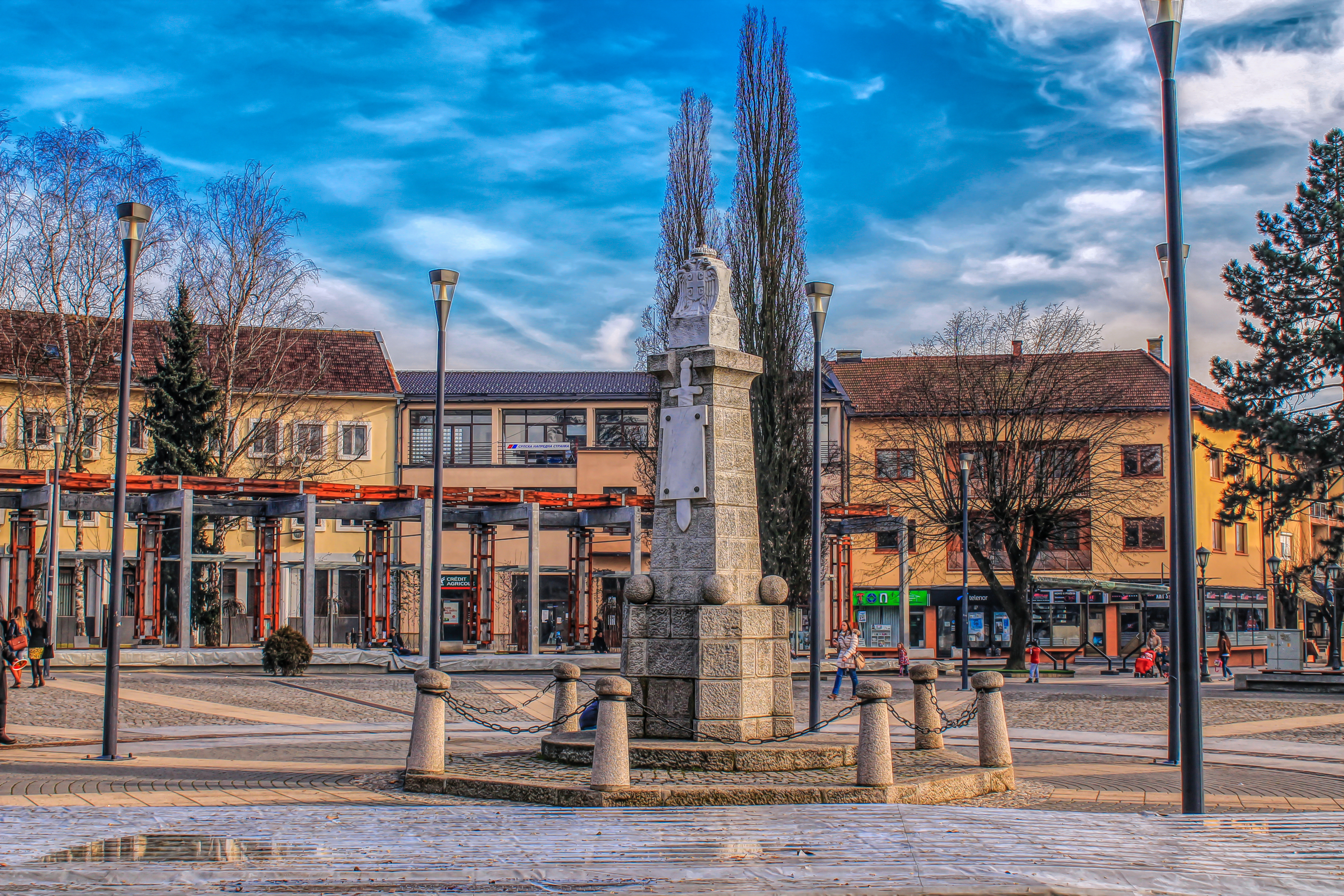
The memorial fountain in the town center

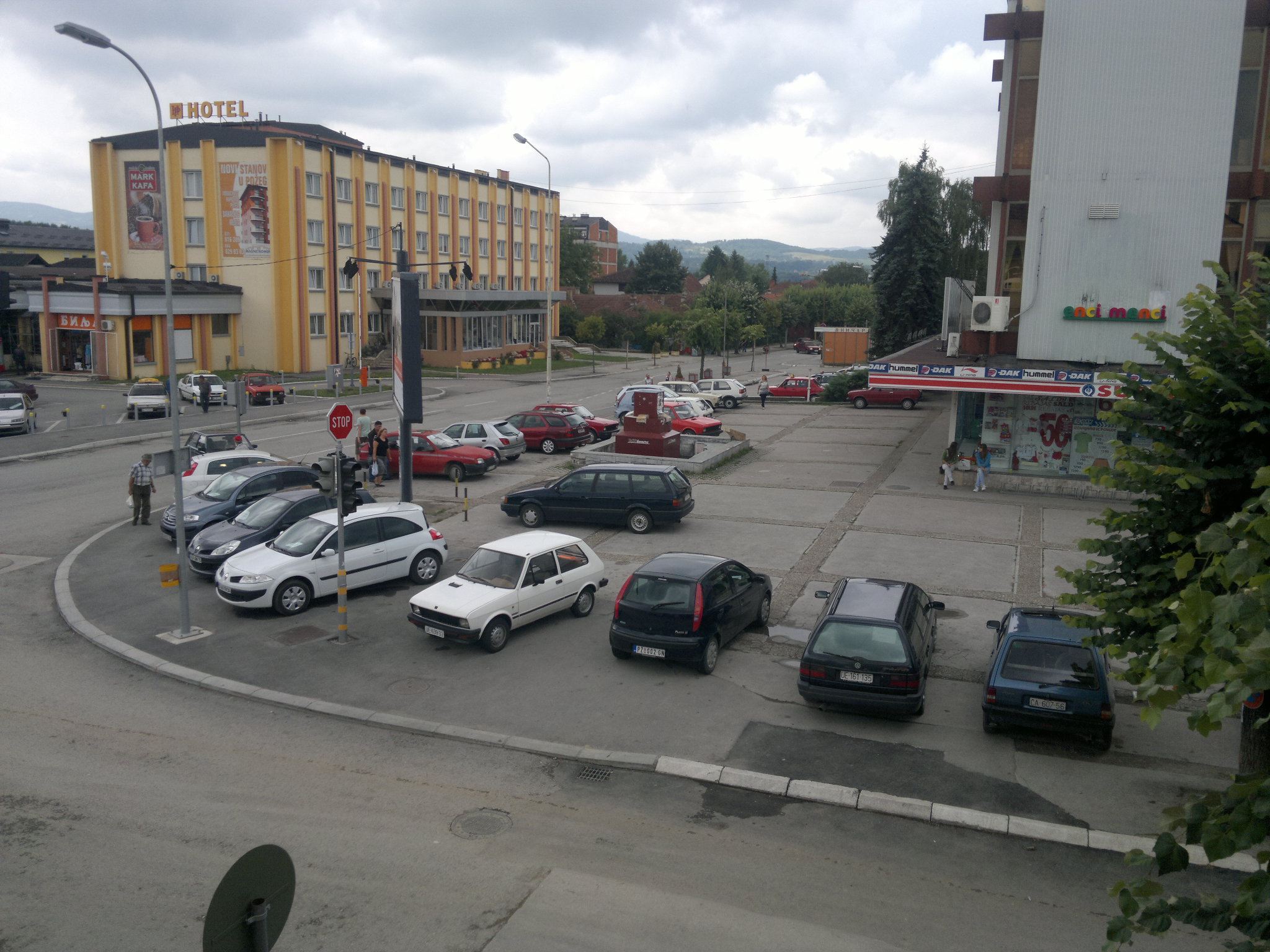
Town center

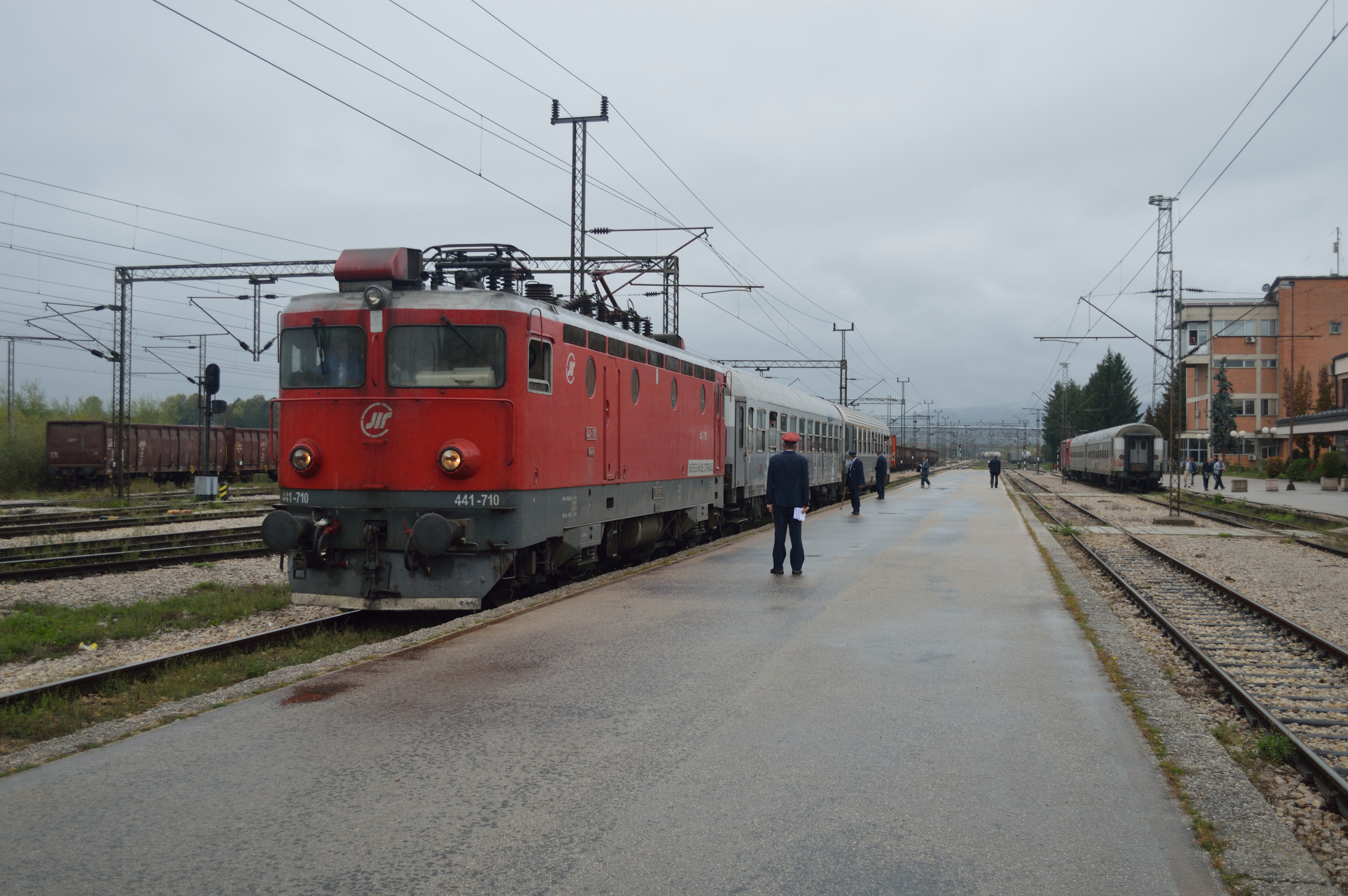
The local railway station

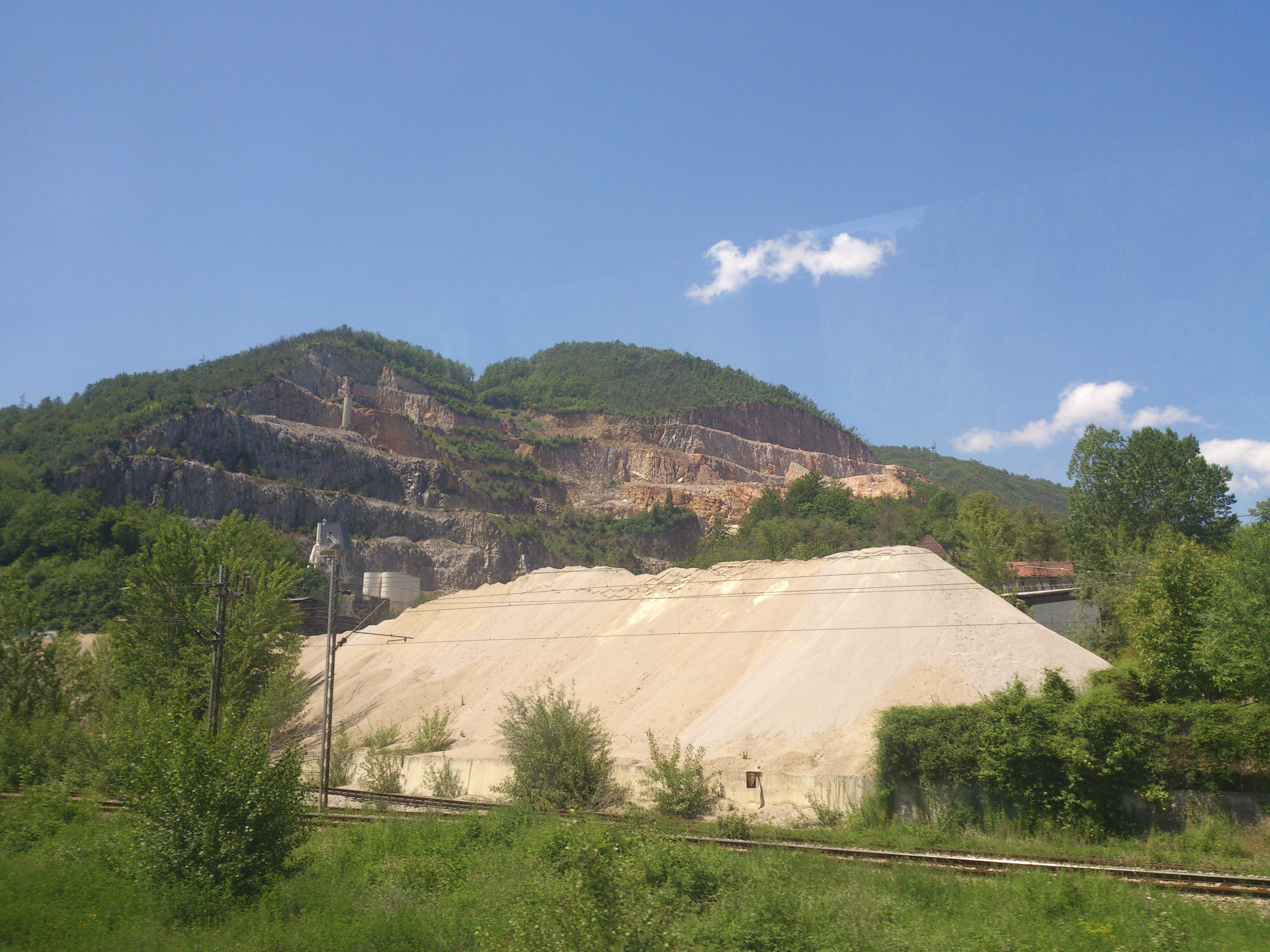
Jelen Do mining complex

== Notable people ==
- Miloš Obrenović I (1780–1860), first monarch of modern Serbia
- Dragiša Lapčević (1867–1939), politician
- Petar Leković (1893–1942), the first person to be awarded with Order of the People's Hero title
- Milovan Destil Marković (1957), artist
- Srđan Mijailović (1993), football player
- Darko Kovačević (archaeologist), maritime and underwater archaeologist
