= Zlatibor District =

Administrative district of Serbia

Zlatibor District Златиборски округ
- Administrative district of Serbia
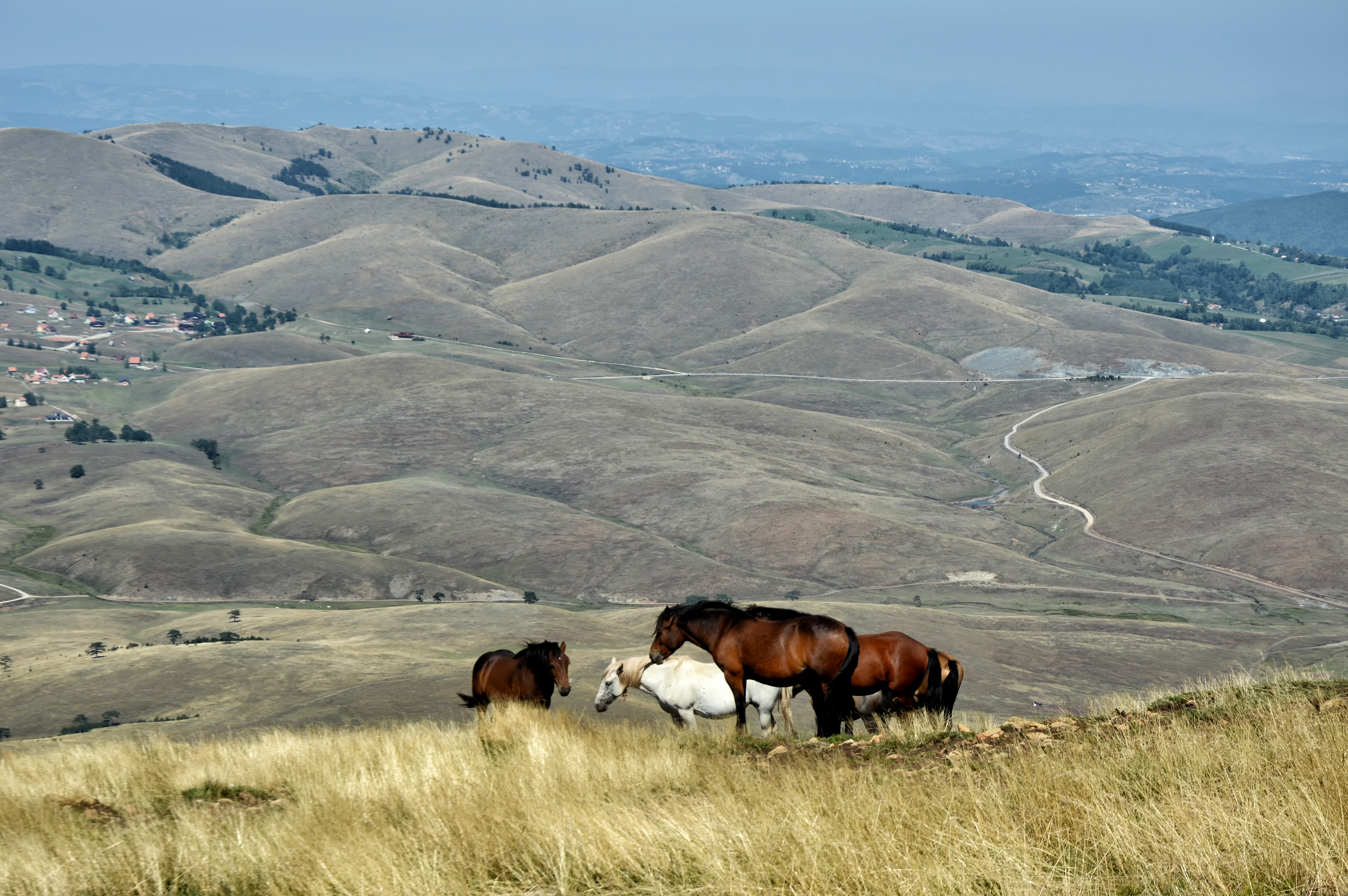
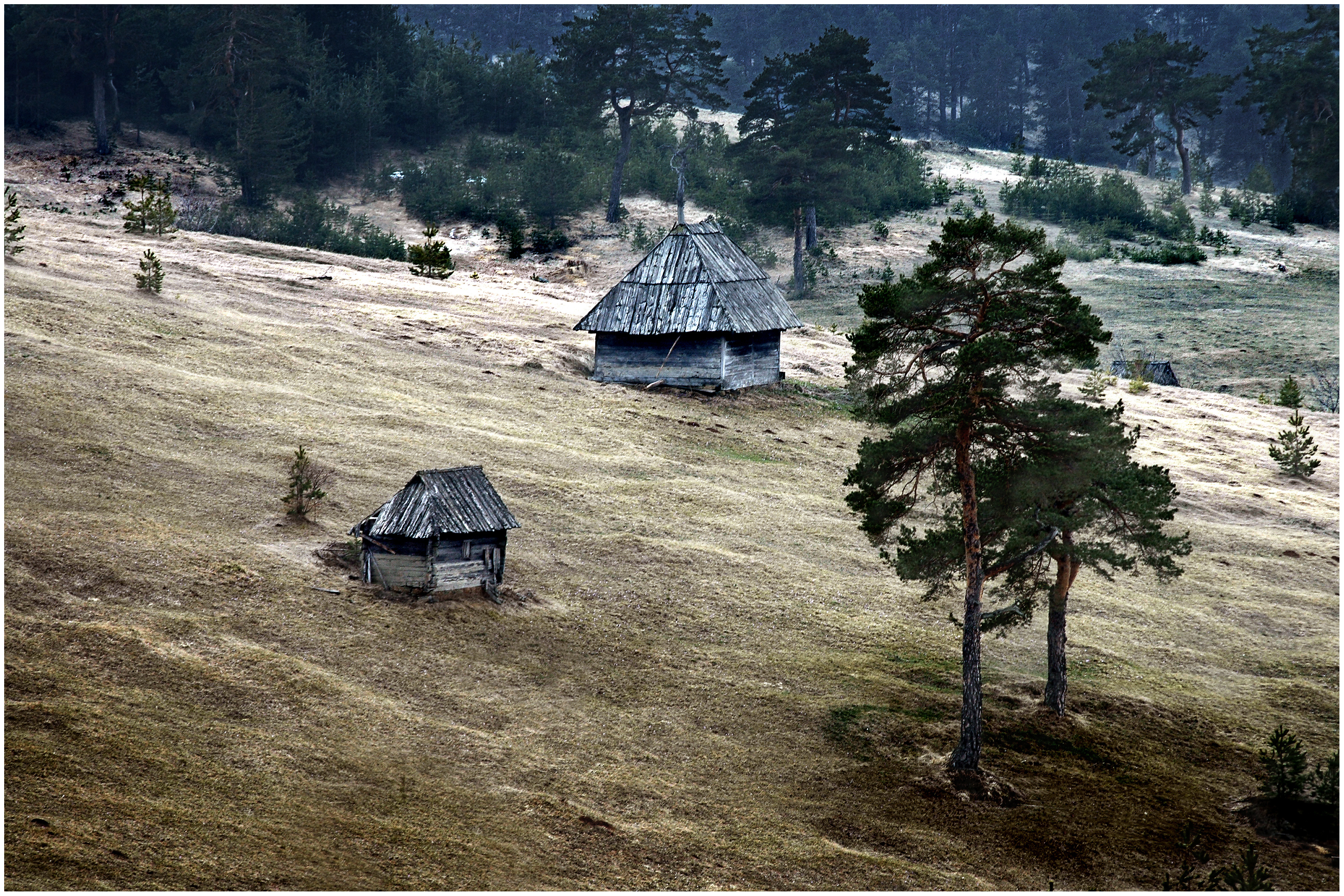
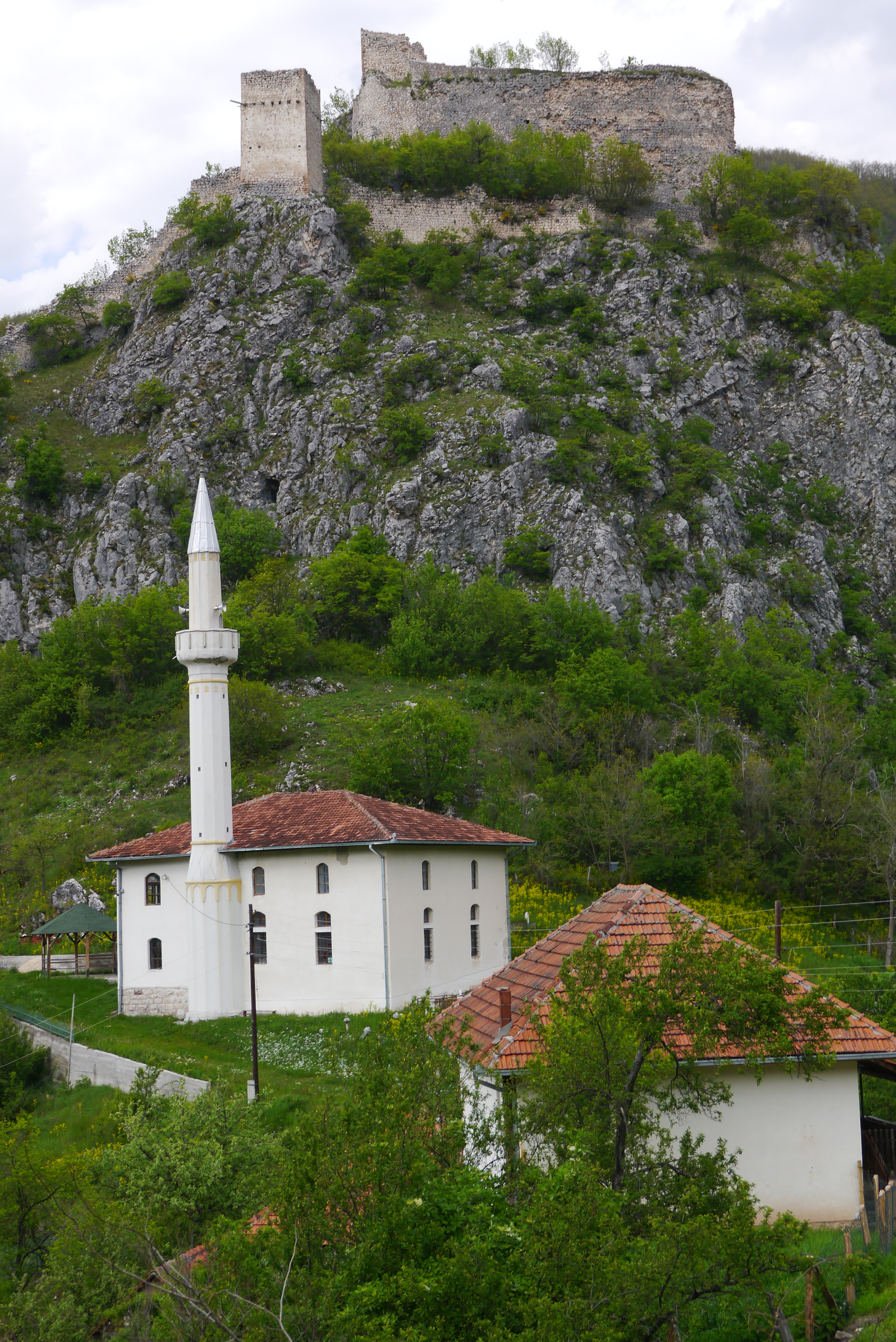
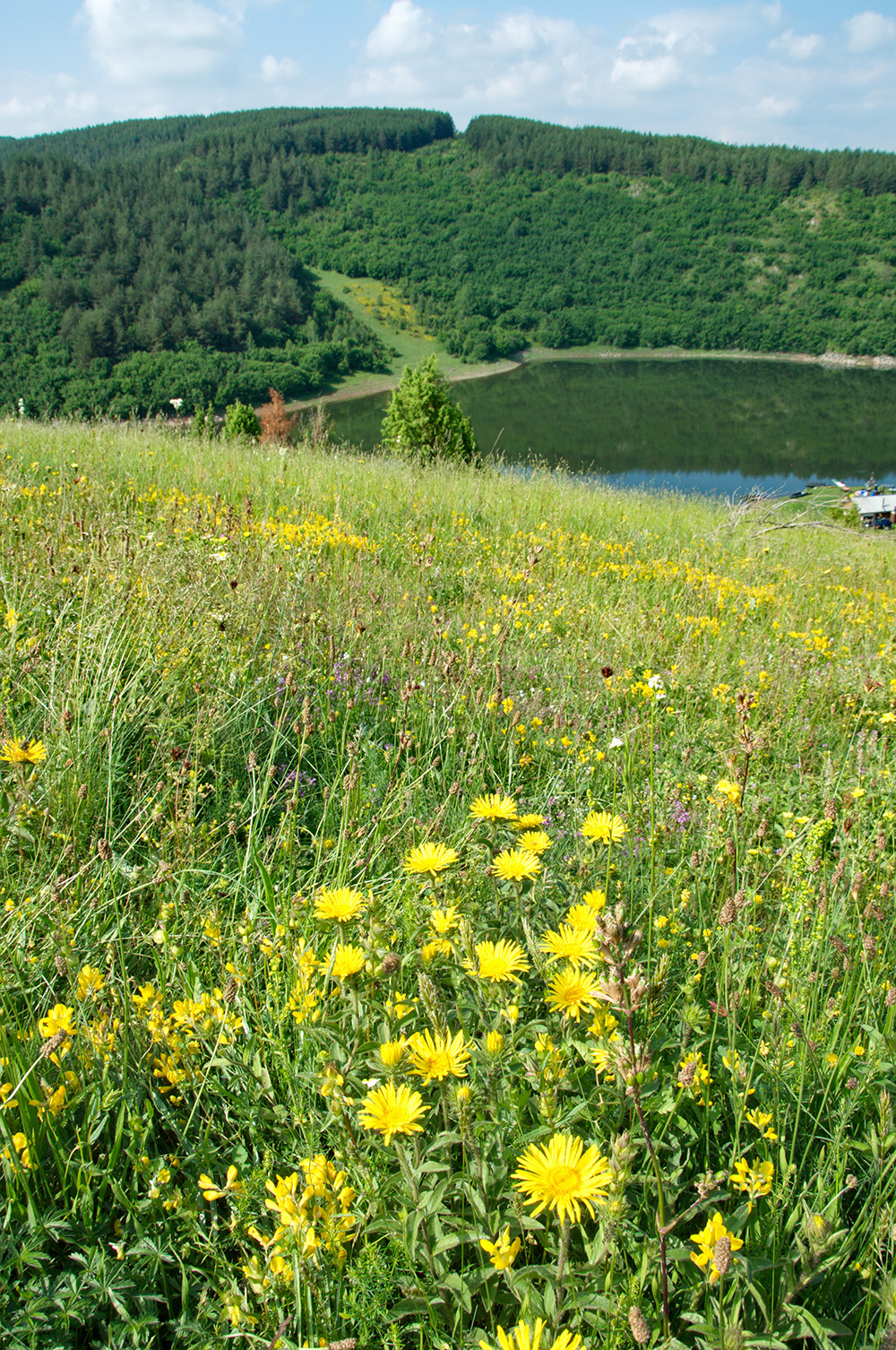
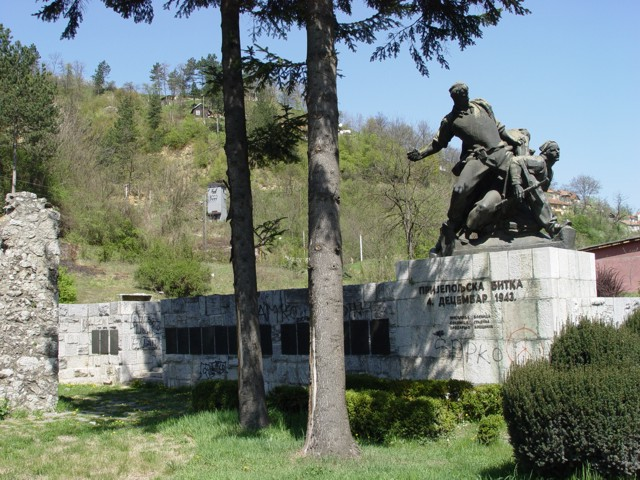
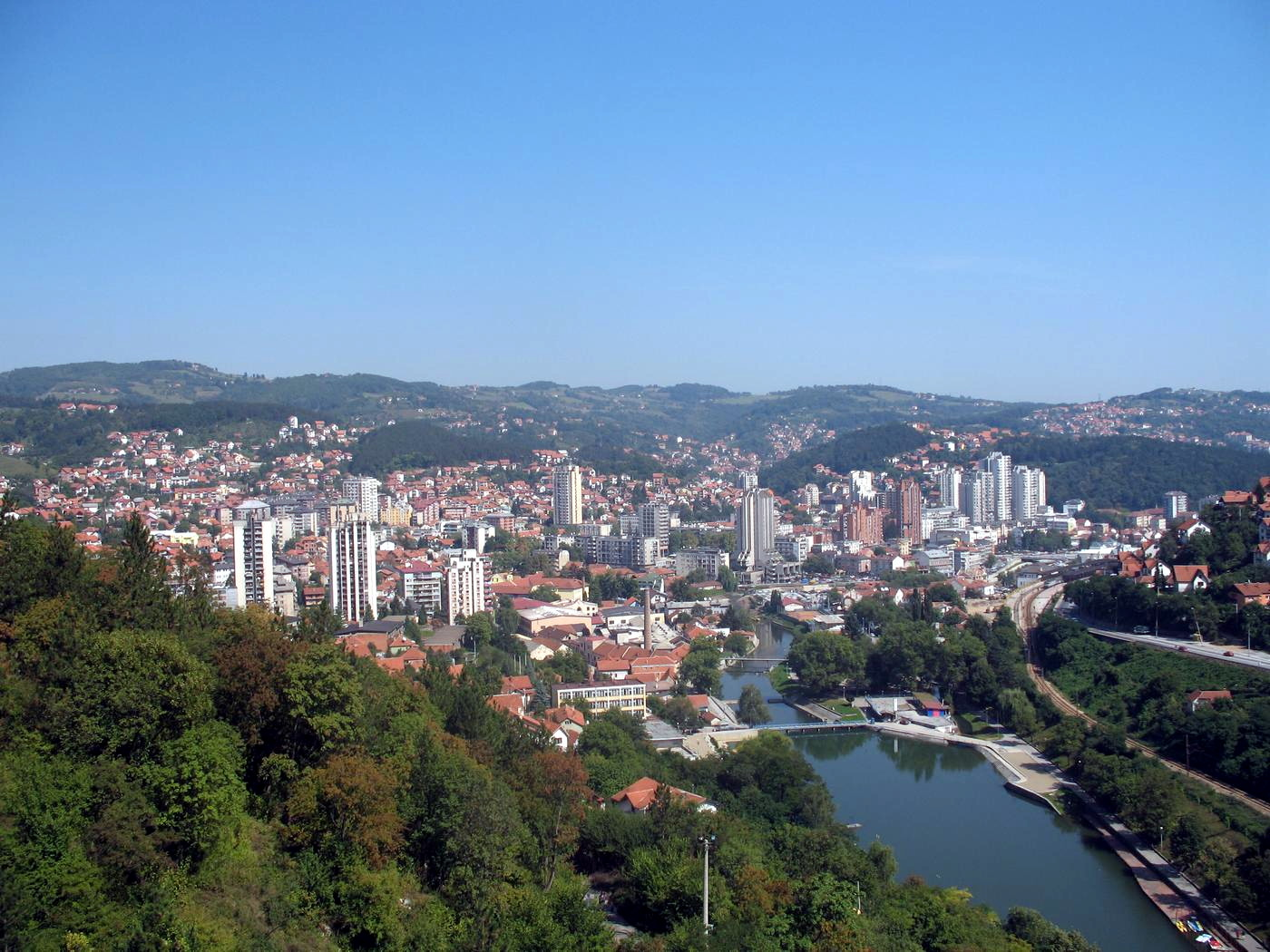
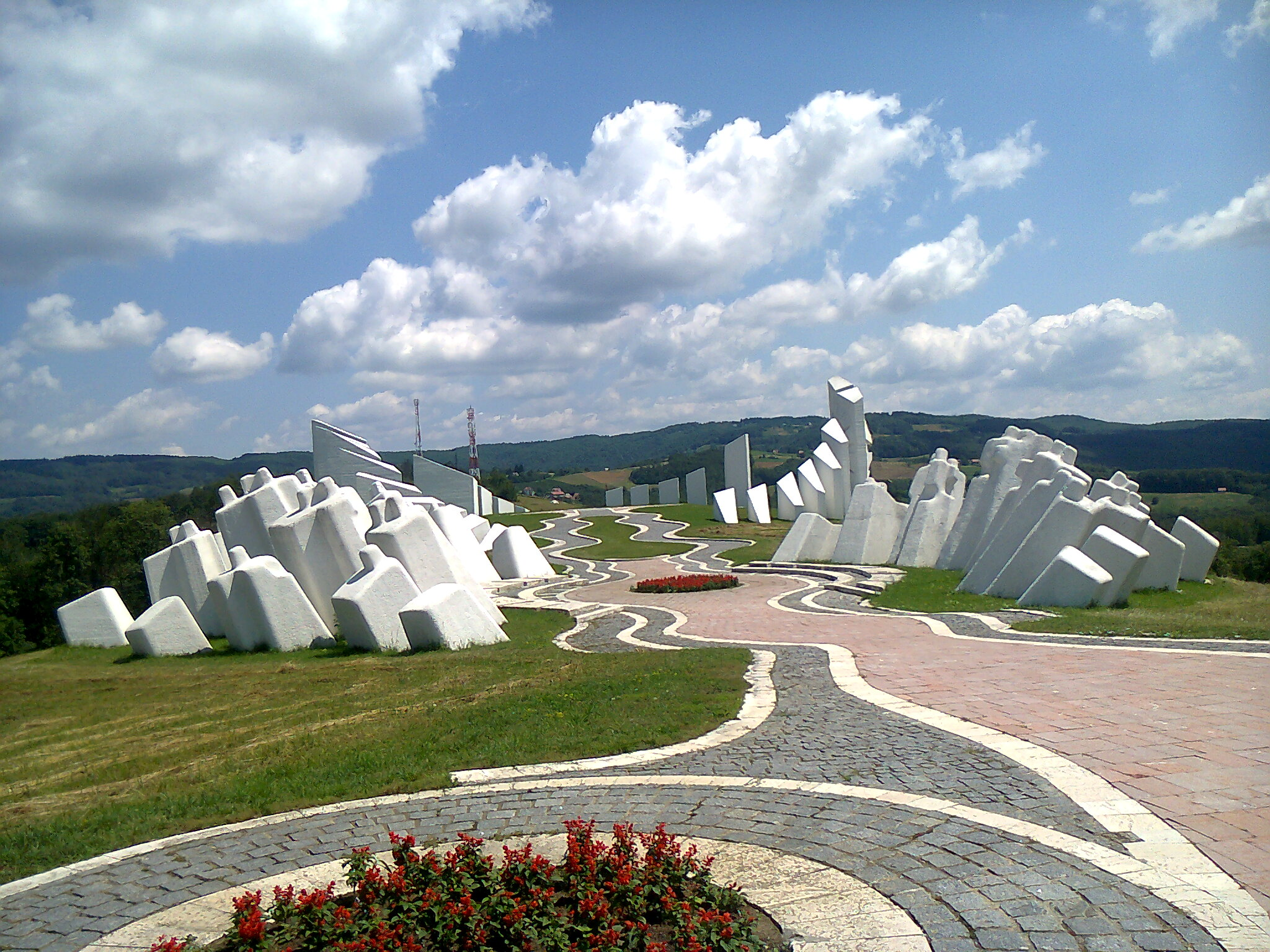
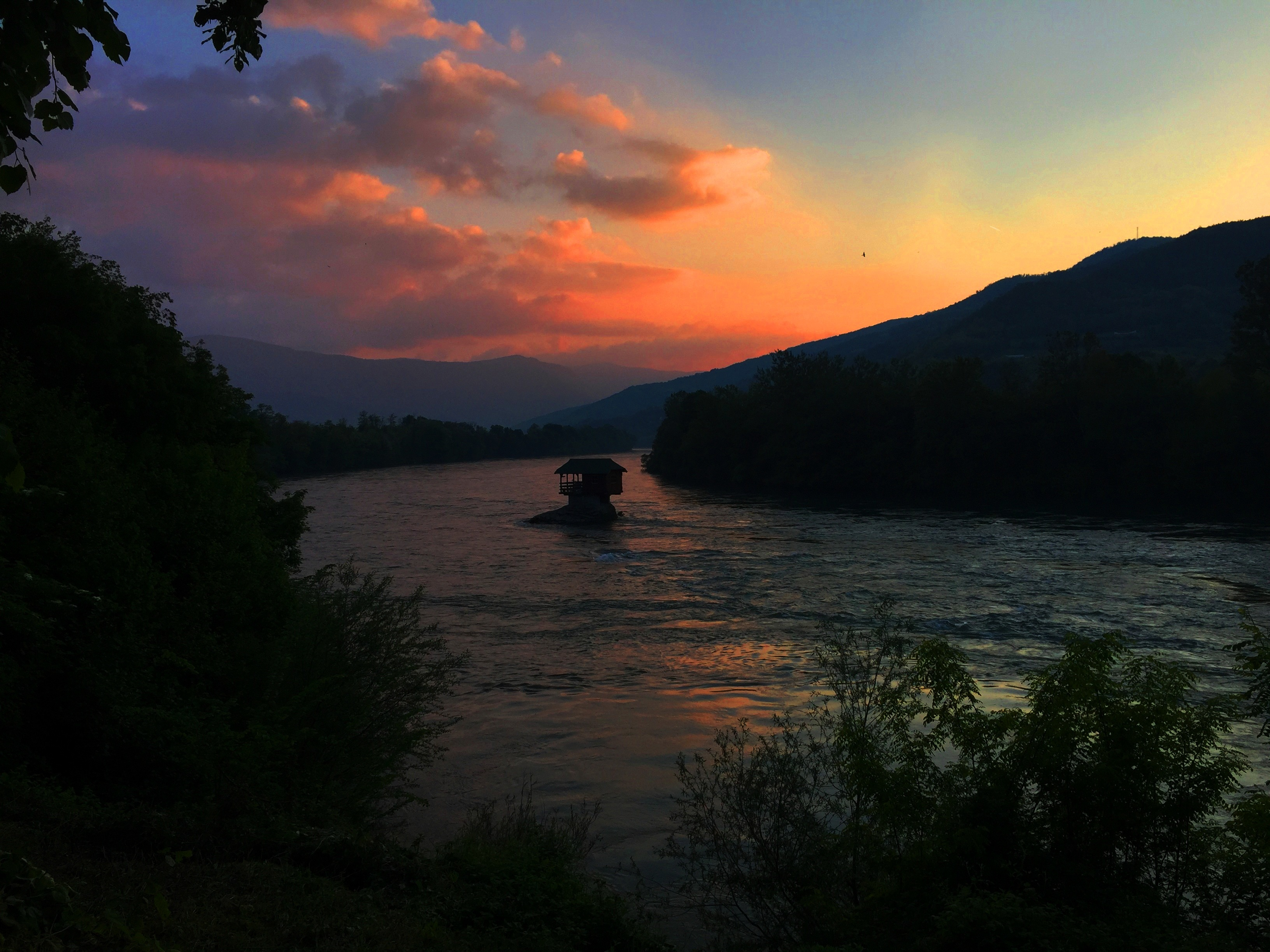
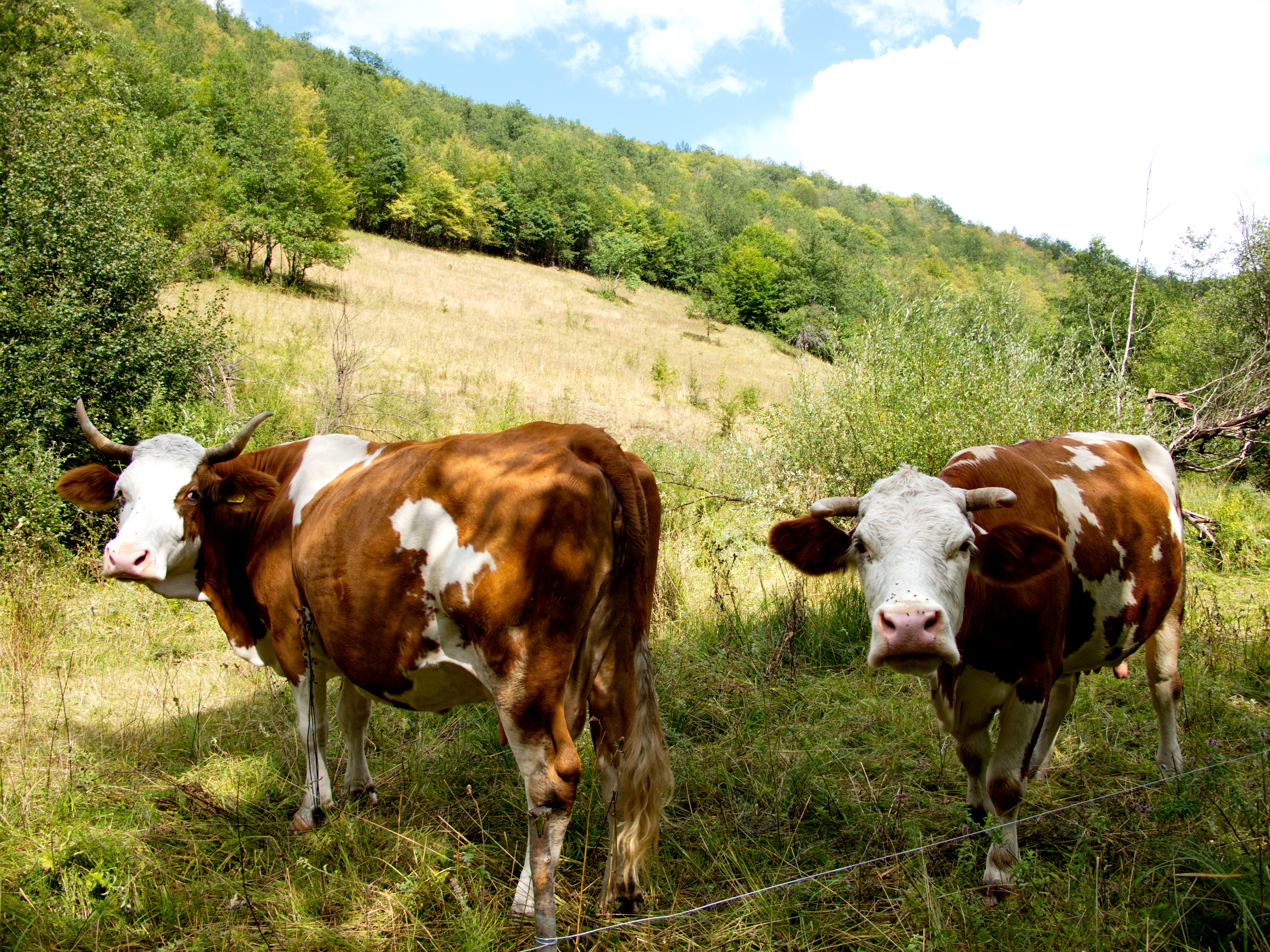
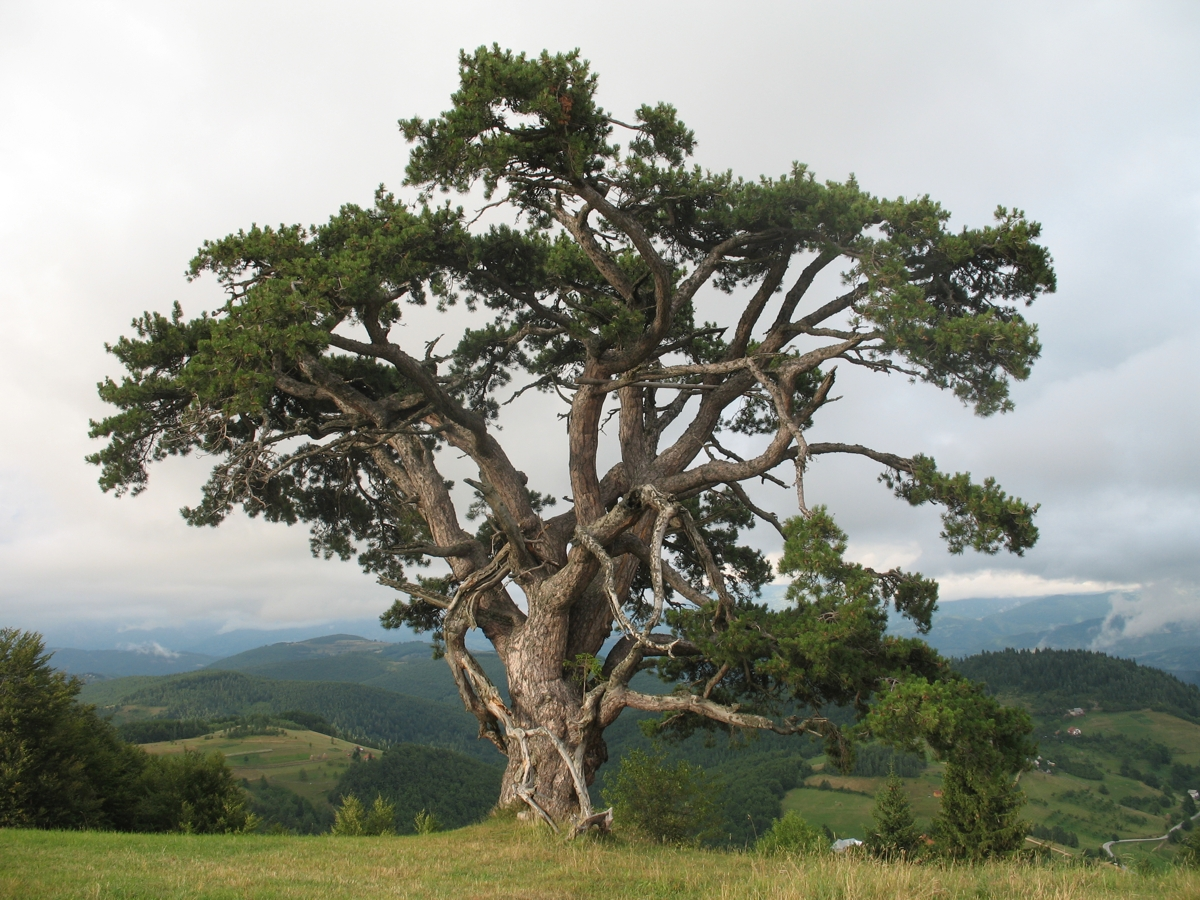
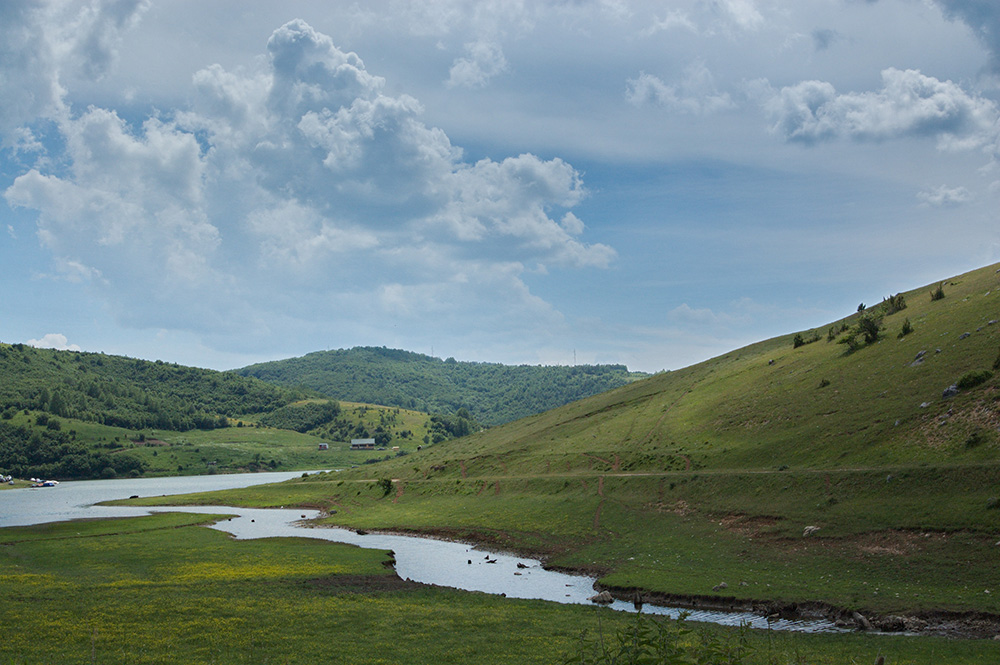
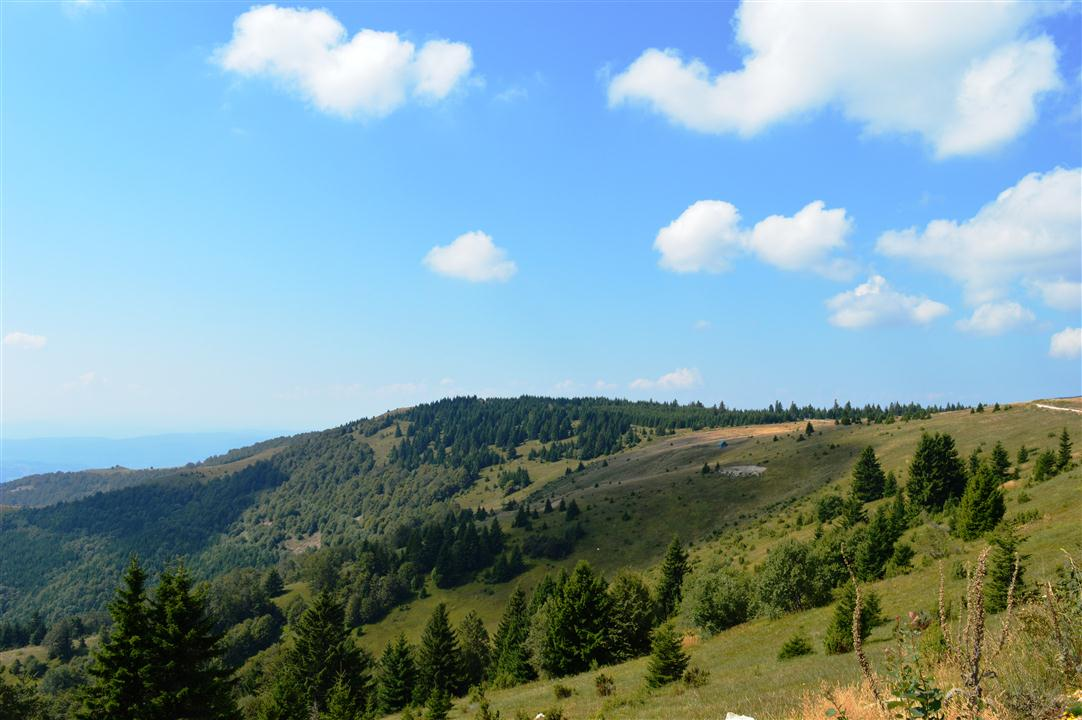
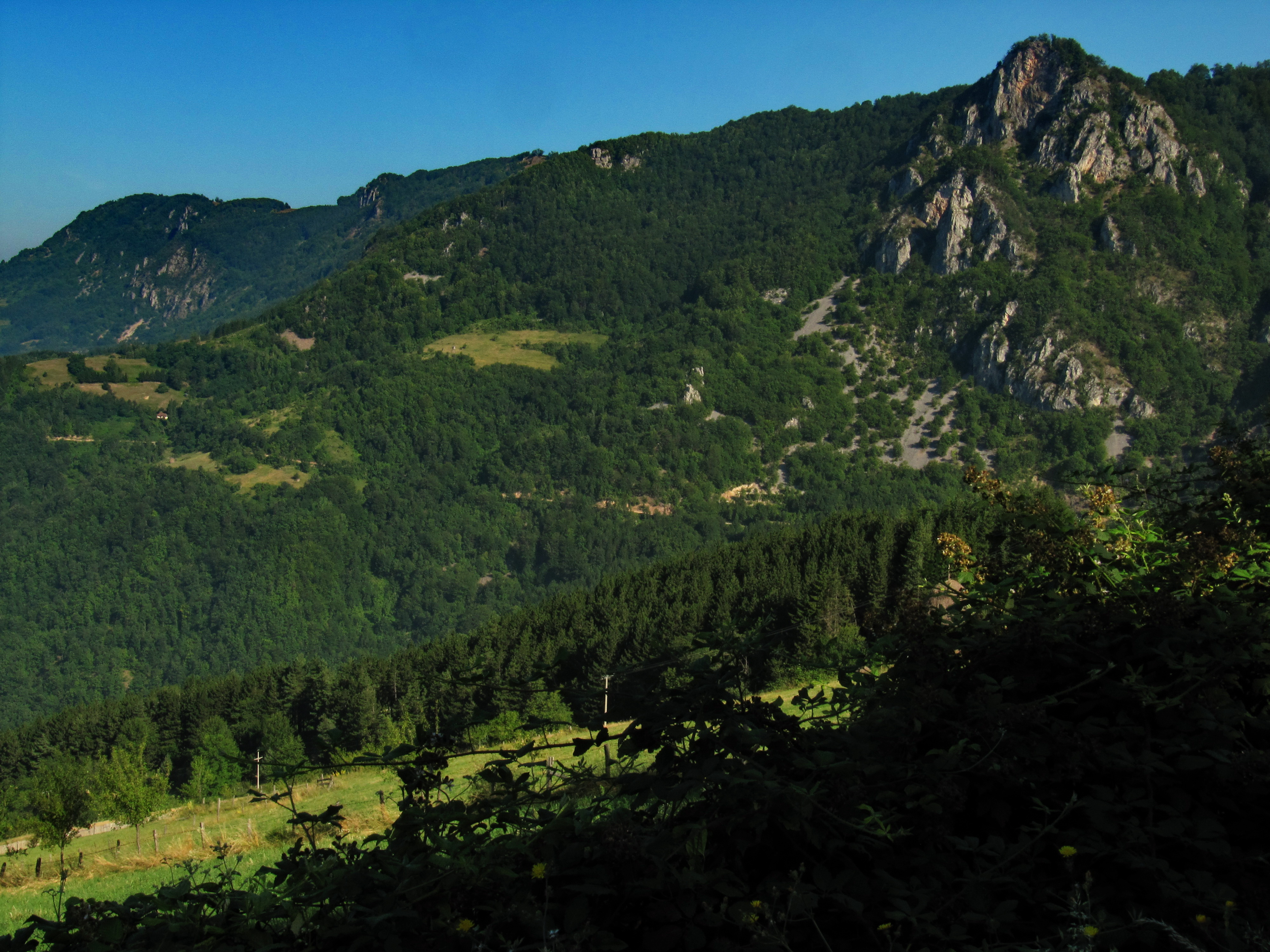
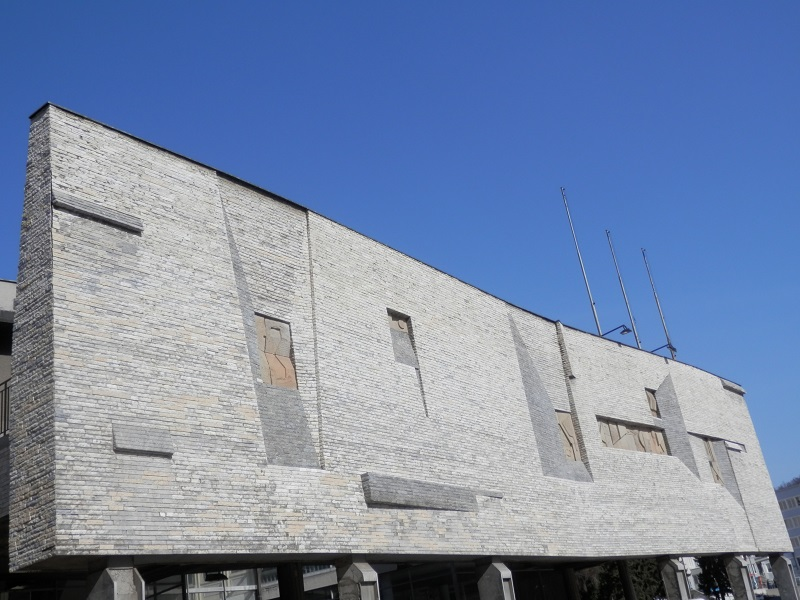
- Images from the Zlatibor District

- Location of district in Serbia
- Coordinates: 43°51′N 19°51′E
- Country: Serbia
- Administrative center: Užice

Government
  - Commissioner: Boban Perišić

Area
  - Total: 6,140 km^{2} (2,370 sq mi)

Population (2022)
  - Total: 254,659
  - Density: 41.5/km^{2} (107/sq mi)
- ISO 3166 code: RS-16
- Municipalities: 9 and 1 city
- Settlements: 438
- Cities and towns: 11
- Villages: 427
- Website: zlatiborski.okrug.gov.rs

The Zlatibor District (Serbian: Златиборски округ, romanized: Zlatiborski okrug, pronounced [zlǎtiboːrskiː ôkruːɡ]) is one of administrative districts of Serbia. It is located in the western part of the country and with an area of 6,140 km² it is Serbia's largest district. According to the 2022 census, it has a population of 254,659 inhabitants. The administrative center of the Zlatibor District is the city of Užice.

== History ==
The present-day administrative districts (including Zlatibor District) were established in 1992 by a decree of the Government of Serbia.

== Cities and municipalities ==
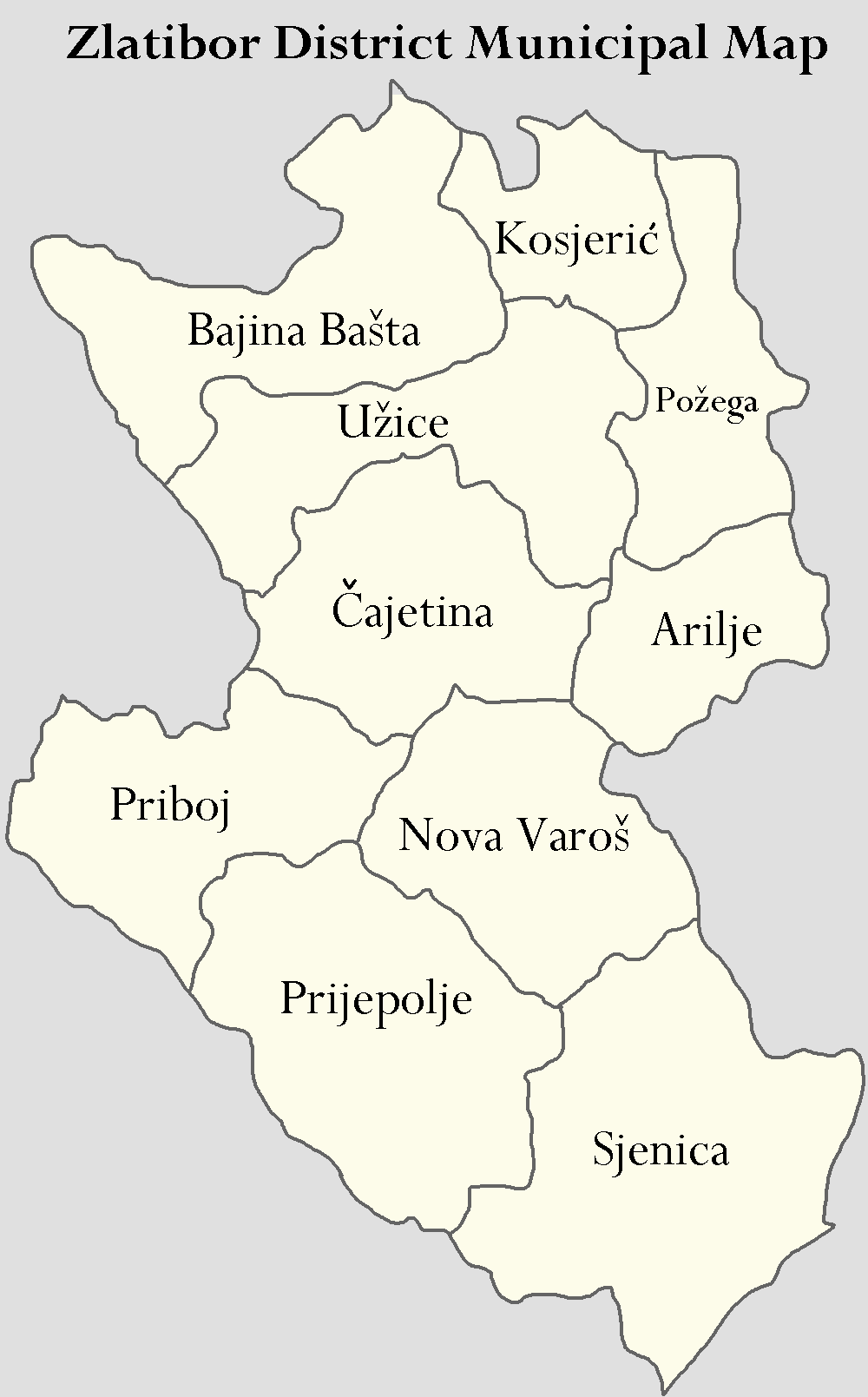
Map of the Zlatibor District

Zlatibor District encompasses the territories of one city and nine municipalities:

- Užice (city)
- Arilje (municipality)
- Bajina Bašta (municipality)
- Čajetina (municipality)
- Kosjerić (municipality)
- Nova Varoš (municipality)
- Požega (municipality)
- Priboj (municipality)
- Prijepolje (municipality)
- Sjenica (municipality)

== Demographics ==
Historical population
Year	Pop.	±% p.a.
1948	270,830	—
1953	293,015	+1.59%
1961	308,918	+0.66%
1971	324,065	+0.48%
1981	335,570	+0.35%
1991	335,826	+0.01%
2002	313,396	−0.63%
2011	286,549	−0.99%
2022	254,659	−1.07%

=== Towns ===
There are three towns with over 10,000 inhabitants.

- Užice: 48,539
- Požega: 12,362
- Prijepolje: 11,928

=== Ethnic structure ===
Ethnicity	Population	Share
Serbs	200,254	78.6%
Bosniaks	35,346	13.9%
ethnic Muslims	4,272	1.6%
Others	2,026	0.8%
Undeclared/Unknown	12,761	5%

== See also ==
- Administrative districts of Serbia
- Administrative divisions of Serbia
