= Užice Speech =

Eastern Herzegovinian subdialect of Užice

Užice speech
- ужички говор / užički govor
- Pronunciation: [ˈuʃə̆tʃkiː ˈɡɔʋɔːr]
- Native to: Serbia
- Region: Zlatibor
- Language family: Indo-European: Balto-Slavic; Slavic; South Slavic; Western South Slavic; Shtokavian; Neo-Shtokavian; Eastern Herzegovinian; Užice speech

Language codes
- ISO 639-3: –
- Glottolog: uzic1234

The Užice speech (Serbo-Croatian: ужички говор / užički govor), also known as the Zlatibor speech (Serbo-Croatian: златиборски говор / zlatiborski govor), is a Neo-Shtokavian subdialect of the Eastern Herzegovinian dialect traditionally spoken in the Zlatibor region in southwestern Serbia. The dialect is spoken by approximately 500,000 people, including both ethnic Serbs and Bosniaks living in the area.

== Names ==
One of the earliest mentions of the local dialect of Užice region is found in Ottoman geographer Evliya Çelebi's record on his visit to the Užice nahiya in 1664. In his travelogue, the language of Užicans is called the "Bosnian language".

Nowadays, ethnic Serbs living in the region usually claim to speak Serbian, whereas ethnic Bosniaks claim to speak Bosnian.

== Classification ==
The Užice dialect is a Neo-Štokavian dialect with dominantly of Ekavian pronunciation (in the past it was dominantly of Ijekavian pronunciation). It is characterized by an Eastern Herzegovinian accenting system consisting of four pitch accents with long vowels following accented syllables, and a case system using full declension. Today many people in the Užice region, especially in urban areas, use the Ekavian accent (which is dominant in Serbia) in speech and writing, instead of the traditional Ijekavian. Nevertheless, the original Ijekavian forms of local toponyms such as Bioska, Đetinja, Prijepolje, Bjeluša, Kosjerić, Drijetanj etc., are usually preserved, as these are the names used in official documents and other publications. However, there is also a number of toponyms which were Ekavized in the written language, although their original Ijekavian forms have often survived in the spoken language. These include Donja Bela Reka / Gornja Bela Reka, Kriva Reka, Seništa and others, which can often be heard as Bijela Rijeka, Kriva Rijeka, Sjeništa etc. in conversation among the locals.

In the Central South Slavic dialect continuum, the Užice speech forms a transition between the neighboring dialects of Bosnia and Herzegovina and the dialects of Serbia. Some of its characteristics are shared with either dialects, but many of them are common with the Bosnian vernacular rather than the dialects of the rest of Serbia; the reduction of short unaccented vowels in speech and other characteristics of the local phonetics, morphology, and lexis, the latter manifested primarily in many loanwords from Turkish, Persian, and Arabic languages, which are, however, suppressed and less used in the modern language.

== History ==
The local population descends from the Slavs who mixed with Illyrian and Celtic tribes in the early Middle Ages, and therefore the dialect in its earliest mediaeval form has been rather influenced by the Celtic and Illyrian languages, the remaining of which are some local toponyms of Illyrian or Romanized Celtic etymology, such as Tara Mountain, Negbina, Murtenica or the medieval Užice personal name Brajan of Celtic origin.

Medieval records of local toponyms show Ikavian characteristics of the local Slavonic vernacular, similarly to the mediaeval Bosnian language. These toponyms include Bila Rika, Siča Rika, Biluša, and others, which are today known as Bela Reka or Bijela Rijeka, Seča Reka, and Bjeluša (either Ijekavian accent or Ekavized during the 19th and 20th centuries).

The dialect's vocabulary was later influenced by the Ottoman Turkish language. A mention of the respectable Turkish influence on Užican language and mentality is also found in the novel Došljaci by a notable Užice writer Milutin Uskoković:

The Turkish influence still remained in speech and mentality. The language ... is full with Turkish words. Older Užicans are at home still very much like the Turks

— Milutin Uskoković, Došljaci (1919)

During the 17th, 18th, and 19th centuries, the Zlatibor region was mostly populated by the migrants from Herzegovina, Montenegro, and other Dinaric regions. Most of the present-day inhabitants of the region descend from these settlers. The local dialect was then influenced by the Younger Ijekavian dialects of Herzegovina and Montenegro thus becoming one of the Eastern Herzegovinian subdialects.

== Characteristics ==
- Interrogatory pronouns are šta (what) and ko (who), according to which the pronoun nešta (something) is used instead of the standard nešto; and što (why) is used with the meaning of the standard zašto.
- The dialect has younger Štokavian accentuation consisting of four accents and long vowels following the accented syllables, and the full declension using the ending -a in genitive plural and a same form for dative, instrumental, and locative plural. The post-accent long vowels are more frequent in the Užican dialect than in the standard language, appearing on all vocative endings and the praeterite suffixes.
- The old vowel yat is replaced with ije in long syllables and je in the short ones. Before another vowel or a palatal consonant, it is replaced with i, and after a consonant cluster or the consonant r, it is pronounced as e. The reflex of long yat (ije) is always bisyllabic, while it is diphthongal in some other Ijekavian dialects.
- The older Ijekavian yat reflex has been kept in several pronouns and declension endings: ovijem instead of the standard ovim, moijem instead of mojim, starijem for starim etc.
- The dialectal Ijekavian iotation (dj > đ [dʑ], tj > ć [tɕ]) has been preserved: đe for gdje, đevojka for djevojka, đeca for djeca, međed for medvjed, lećeti for letjeti, ćerati for tjerati etc. The iotation also affects sound /s/, and to a lesser degree sounds /z/ and /ts/, yielding [ɕ] or [ʃʲ] for sj, [ʑ] or [ʒʲ] for zj, and [tɕ] for cj: sjutra > śutra, posjek > pośek, cjepanica > ćepanica etc. More archaic Ijekavian iotation affecting labial sounds (pj > plj [pʎ], vj > vlj [vʎ]) is found in the text of the Prophecy of Kremna but is, however, usually omitted.
- Several dialectal words and expressions are differently built, such as: sjutra or sjutre (that is, śutra or śutre when the iotation occurs) instead of the standard sutra; puštiti instead of pustiti; jošte instead of još; računjati instead of računati; morem, more instead of mogu, može; bidem or bidnem instead of budem; četri instead of četiri; potlje and pošlje instead of poslije or posle; as well as dialectal expressions najvolim and najposle.
- The ending -t is used instead of -n for the passive voice of the verbs of the II, IV, V, and VII grammatical conjugation: napisat, napisata for napisan, napisana; izabrat for izabran and so on.
- Sounds /f/ and /x/ have been either lost or replaced with sounds /p/, /ʋ/, /j/, /k/, /ɡ/ or /s/: ljeb for hljeb, njig for njih, kava for kafa, oras for orah, stio for htio, kujna for kuhinja etc. The sound /j/ is also less used when occurs near the vowel /i/ giving starii for stariji, moi for moji, Alin for Alijin (as in toponym Alin Potok) etc.
- Several sound changes such as sibilarization, assimilation, metathesis or elision occur more frequently in the Užican dialect, whilst i-mutation usually occurs less frequently. Vowel groups ao and ae have merged into o and e: rekao > reko, posao > poso, dvanaest > dvanes.
- Short unaccented vowels /i/, /ɛ/, and /u/ are being reduced in common speech, a manner of articulation that is widespread in the related dialects of Bosnia and Herzegovina.
- The dialect's lexis includes some regional and archaic expressions as well as many loans from Turkish.

== Phonetics ==
Vowels
	front	central	back
close	i		u
mid	ɛ	(ə, ə̆) (Note: Schwa is an allophone of /i/, /u/ or /ɛ/, which are reduced in mid-word position when not stressed.)	ɔ
open		ä (Note: The open back unrounded vowel may also occur as an allophone of /a/.)	

Consonants
	labial	dental & alveolar	post- alveolar	alveolo- palatal	palatal	velar
plosive	p b	t d (Note: Sounds /t/, /d/, /s/, /z/, and /ts/ are pronounced with the tip of the tongue against the teeth rather than against the alveolar ridge, thus being more dental than truly alveolar.)				k ɡ
Nasal	m	n			ɲ	(ŋ) (Note: The velar nasal is not a phoneme, it only occurs as an allophone of /n/ before velar consonants, e.g. [ˈbraːŋko].)
fricative		s z	ʃ ʒ	ɕ (ʑ) (Note: The alveolo-palatal fricatives occur when /s/ or /ʃ/ and /z/ or /ʒ/ undergone iotation. The voiced alveolo-palatal fricative is much rarer because the iotation with /z/ is usually omitted.)		
affricate		ts	tʃ dʒ	tɕ dʑ		
trill		r (Note: The alveolar trill can be syllabic in some words.)				
approximant	ʋ				j	
lateral approximant		l (ɫ) (Note: The alveolar lateral approximant is usually velarized in this dialect.)			ʎ	

== Literature ==
The significant portion of the Užice vernacular literature consists of local anecdotes and proverbs, as well as the epic and lyric poems, both of which are usually sung according to a common metric system consisting of ten units (ten syllables in a verse), and often performed with gusle. The hero of all Užice/Zlatibor anecdotes is called Ero (another name for Užice/Zlatibor people, also spelled Era), who is portrayed as a most clever, witty, and hospitable person, although he is just a simple Zlatiborian peasant. In these short anecdotes, he always succeeds to trick the others at the end, even though they hold a higher position in the society or are often considered smarter than him (priests, Ottoman and Serbian nobility, the police, etc.). Characters similar to smart and clever Ero are found in anecdotes across the Balkans: in the stories about Nasredin Hodža, of oriental origin, or Karagiozis in the Greek and Turkish literatures.

The written literature, on the other hand, usually stuck to the standard language; that is Old Church Slavonic and Church Slavonic in the Middle Ages, and later the standard Serbian language. The first Užican printed book, Rujansko četvorojevanđelje (the Gospels of Rujno), was printed in Church Slavonic in 1537. Other Church Slavonic books printed in the Užice region include Psalter printed in Mileševa monastery in 1544, and Evangelion and Pentecostarion printed in Mrkša’s Church in 1562 and 1566, respectively. After the printing centres in Užican monasteries were demolished by the Ottoman Turks, a manuscript culture arose in the Rača monastery. The manuscripts produced in Rača were written in Church Slavonic, but they contained many elements of the Užican vernacular. The first works compiled in the local dialect by literate Užicans appeared in the 19th century. They include Miladin Radović's chronicle Samouki rukopis, and the Prophecy of Kremna which was told by Zechariah Zaharić, the protopope of Kremna.
