= Uskoković =

Uskoković is a surname. Notable people with the surname include:

- Aleksa Uskoković (born 1999), Serbian basketball player
- Dragan Uskoković (born 1950), Serbian and Montenigrin playwright
- Luka Uskoković (born 1996), Montenegrin footballer
- Mardarije Uskoković (1889–1935), Serbian Orthodox Bishop
- Milutin Uskoković (1884–1915), Serbian short story writer
- Veljko Uskoković (born 1971), Montenegrin water polo player
