= Duboko =

Duboko may refer to the following villages:

- Duboko, Bosnia and Herzegovina
- Duboko, Ljubovija, Serbia
- Duboko, Užice, Serbia
