= Volujac =

Volujac may refer to te following places:

== Bosnia and Herzegovina ==
- Volujac, Bosnia and Herzegovina

== Serbia ==
- Volujac (Užice)
- Volujac (Šabac)
