= Strmac =

Strmac may refer to:

- Strmac (Priboj), a village in the Priboj municipality, Serbia
- Strmac (Užice), a village in the Užice municipality, Serbia
