= Kršanje =

Kršanje Кршање
- Village
- Location within Serbia
- Coordinates: 43°48′03″N 19°26′51″E
- Country: Serbia
- District: Zlatibor District
- Municipality: Užice

Area
  - Total: 32.99 km^{2} (12.74 sq mi)
- Elevation: 970 m (3,180 ft)

Population (2011)
  - Total: 108
  - Density: 3.27/km^{2} (8.48/sq mi)
- Time zone: UTC+1 (CET)
  - Summer (DST): UTC+2 (CEST)

Kršanje (Serbian Cyrillic: Кршање) is a village located in the city of Užice, southwestern Serbia. As of 2011 census, the village had a population of 108 inhabitants.
