= Ravni (Užice) =

Ravni Равни
- Village
- Location within Serbia
- Coordinates: 43°44′26″N 19°53′45″E
- Country: Serbia
- District: Zlatibor District
- Municipality: Užice

Area
  - Total: 17.97 km^{2} (6.94 sq mi)
- Elevation: 685 m (2,247 ft)

Population (2011)
  - Total: 465
  - Density: 25.9/km^{2} (67.0/sq mi)
- Time zone: UTC+1 (CET)
  - Summer (DST): UTC+2 (CEST)

Ravni (Serbian Cyrillic: Равни) is a village located in the city of Užice, southwestern Serbia. As of 2011 census, the village has a population of 558 inhabitants.
