= Zbojštica =

- Village
- Location within Serbia
- Coordinates: 43°48′N 19°51′E
- Country: Serbia

Population (2011)
  - Total: 167
- Time zone: UTC+1 (CET)
  - Summer (DST): UTC+2 (CEST)

Zbojštica (Serbian Cyrillic: Збојштица) is a village located in the Užice municipality of Serbia. In the 2011 census, the village had a population of 167.
