= Buar =

Buar Буар
- Interactive map of Buar
- Coordinates: 43°52′56″N 19°49′14″E
- Country: Serbia
- District: Zlatibor
- Municipality: Užice

Population (2002)
  - Total: 1,415
- Time zone: UTC+1 (CET)
  - Summer (DST): UTC+2 (CEST)

Buar (Serbian Cyrillic: Буар) is a village located in the Užice municipality of Serbia. In the 2022 census, the village had a population of 1,076.

== History ==
The region around Buar has traces of Neolithic settlement. The village itself was settled in the late 18th and early 19th centuries by Serbs from the villages of Zlatibor, as well as from Kolašin, Grahovo, and Rutoši. It grew from 45 homes in 1818 to 62 in 1921. Electricity was brought to the village in 1951.

== Geography ==
Buar is located on the Jelova gora mountain's southern slopes, west of Užice, and along the Koštice River (Koštička reka) Volujci Stream (Volujački potok). It is considered a suburban settlement of Užice, and a dispersed village.
