= Ljubanje =

- Village
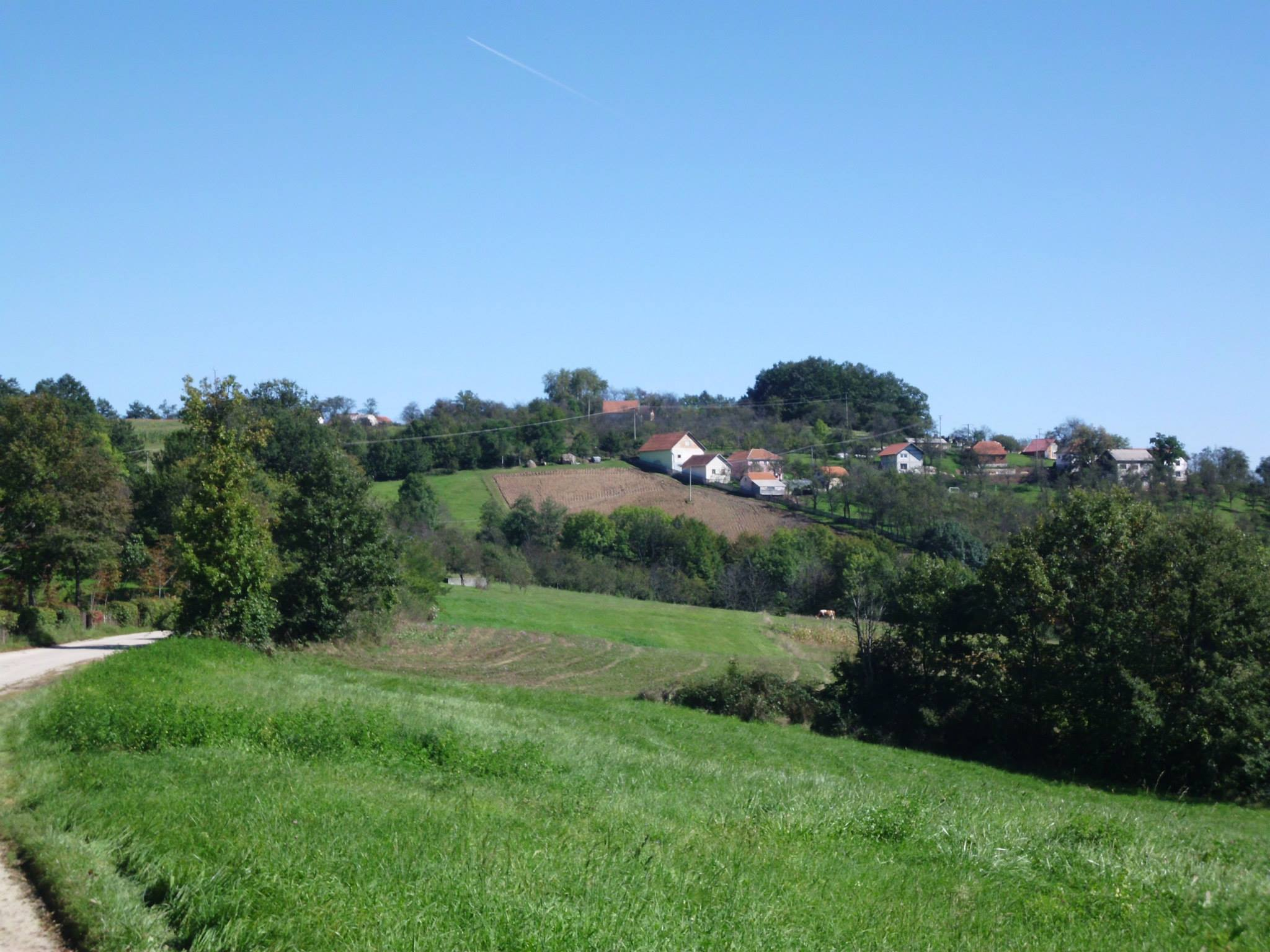
- Selo Ljubanje, 10km udaljeno od Užica

- Location within Serbia
- Coordinates: 43°49′N 19°50′E
- Country: Serbia
- Time zone: UTC+1 (CET)
  - Summer (DST): UTC+2 (CEST)

Ljubanje (Serbian Cyrillic: Љубање) is a village located in the Užice municipality of Serbia. In the 2011 census, the village had a population of 787.
