= Keserovina =

- Village
- Location within Serbia
- Coordinates: 43°52′N 19°41′E
- Country: Serbia
- District: Zlatibor
- Municipality: Užice

Population (2011)
  - Total: 452
- Time zone: UTC+1 (CET)
  - Summer (DST): UTC+2 (CEST)

Keserovina (Serbian Cyrillic: Кесеровина) is a village located in the Užice municipality of Serbia. In the 2011 census, the village had a population of 452 people.
