= Dragan Uskoković =

Serbian and Montenegrin playwright, storyteller, and journalist

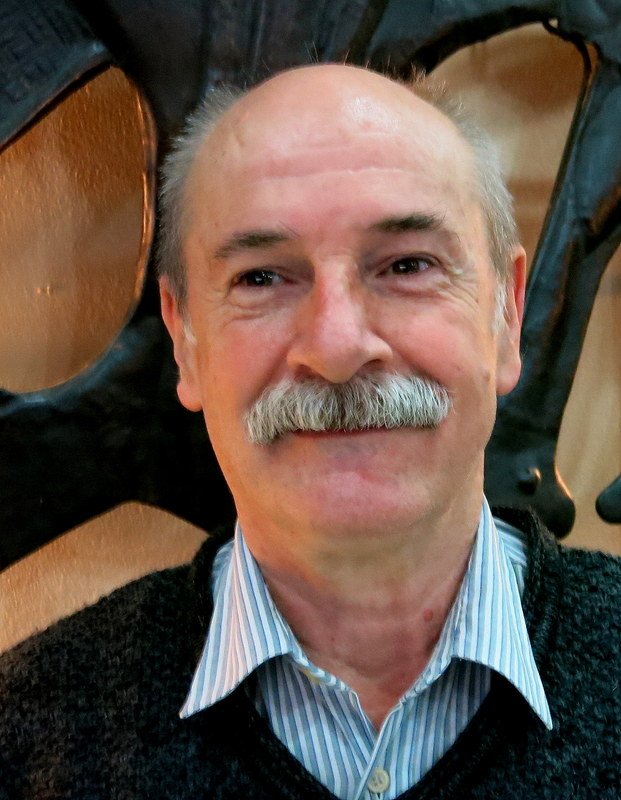

Dragan Uskoković (Serbian Cyrillic: Драган Ускоковић; born 1950 in Cetinje, Montenegro) is a Serbian and Montenegrin playwright, storyteller and journalist.

== Life ==
Born in 1950 in Cetinje to a family with a long line of teachers and priests, he graduated from high school in Podgorica, during which time he acted in plays at the local theatre. In Belgrade, he studied Russian language & literature and ethnology, delivered milk and washed windows so he could graduate from the Faculty of Dramatic Arts in 1978. He lives in Belgrade and writes in the Serbian language.

== Works ==
He published three books: Pile od sokola (Falcon chicken), a selection of short satirical stories (1989), Djina, an anthology of satirical stories (2007) and Čomige (Head bumps), a selection of dramatic works (2001).

He worked mostly as a journalist in newspapers published daily and periodically, but worked in radio and television as well. He wrote for Osmica, Pobjeda, Enigma, Radio Belgrade Channel 3, Stvaranje, Jež, Politika, Večernje novosti, Zastava film, Zeta film, and for television broadcasters such as Radio Television Serbia and Radio-Television of Montenegro. He founded Žižak, the first Serbian crossword magazine for the blind, in Braille, probably the only one of its kind in the world.

He wrote numerous plays for the theatre, such as Čegović, Jabanci (Strangers), Prispjenak, Stidna kapica, Ua, kiša (Boo, rain), Plajvaz (Pencil). His most famous work Čegović was performed continuously for more than 25 years.

He wrote for the film Božićna pesma, Jove, Mlađi brat and also worked for television, e.g. Đe to ima (Where do you have that), Ko si, šta si (Who are you, what are you) and Skriveno blago (Hidden treasure).

He is represented in various theatre, prose and satire anthologies. His works have been translated into the Macedonian and Uzbek languages, while Čegović itself has been published in 100,000 copies in the Russian language alone. Uskoković did some translating himself from several Slavic languages.

== Accolades ==
He received numerous awards:

- Oktobarska nagrada grada Beograda (City of Belgrade October Award) for Čegović (1978),
- Zlatni prsten i Povelja za uređivački podvig (Golden ring and Editorial accomplishment charter) from Journalist Association of Serbia (2006),
- Plaketa Bijeli Pavle (Bijeli Pavle plaque) for best storybook Djina (2007),
- Povelja za dramu (Drama charter) for third best drama play in Serbian language for the period 1944–1994. year (1994),
- Braća Ormai (Ormai brothers) award for satire (2003),
- Ježeva bodlja (Hedgehog's sting) award (2003),
- Milutin Uskoković award for the best short story in Serbian language (2013).
- Radoje Domanović Award of the Association of Writers of Serbia for the contribution to Serbian literary satire, 2017.

== Critique ==
Matija Bećković: “Language is the one that determines the extent, gives importance to the topic and length to the story. Uskoković serves it with monk-like humility, as if the laws of the language are stronger than the forces of life. Authentic and nonpathetic, hidden behind discreet humour, the writer does all to make sure he is seen less and his world seen more. The archaic man is alive. He came to the city, provided himself with a car, a telephone, a refrigerator. He outlasted, because his language outlasted and brought him to this day. Literature knows not for secondary languages, secondary people and secondary human destinies. Once again it showed that a man is only what can be discovered based on language. Uskoković's protagonist appears as one who previously would not have been suitable for the audience, or books, for that matter. When he was supposed to appear, he would always groom himself, wear a disguise, put on make-up. All that to be worthy of memory. But by doing so, he would let himself down and stray from life and truth. But, just as the mountain stream carries the cardboard box, the current of the language carries the loanword or its twisted form. It is enough to simply guess the first word—and Uskoković’s stories are a testament to that—and other words will follow, in accordance with supreme laws and linguistic habits.”

Dr Ratko Božović: “Continuously, artfully consistently, Uskoković has weaved his drama, storytelling, satire and comedy cloth, colorful and unpredictable, as a sign of clear individual recognition. As much as his poetry is of ‘this’ time, it is of ‘that’ time as well. Thus his drama work is embedded in the traditional weavery. The characters, peculiar, hitherto unknown and depicted as mentally strong, meet the modern man with original language and incredible idiomatics. The value of Uskoković's drama lies not in the external action and the Feydeau-like plot, but in the inner world and the language of its protagonists. In fact, what are his personae dramatis like? What is the quality they have in common? Maybe unexpectedly—they are all primarily made of loneliness. It will show that what is urban becomes the fate of collective experience, that it has immense difficulties achieving identity, as if the meaning and purpose of individual life is faced with a utopia that won't accept personality degradation and its inefficacy. He concludes—at the site of the author's critical ethos, there is a clear intent to demystify the ruling beliefs and to dethrone deep-rooted moral patterns."

Dr Zoran Božović: “Dragan Uskoković’s short stories are written in picturesque, juicy language and they contributed to the powerful penetration of Montenegrin topics into Serbian and Yugoslav literature. Uskoković judges the time we live in using numerous storytelling methods in his book Pile od sokola (Falcon chick)—starting from an interesting plot, in medias res, to a narrative storytelling process. Uskoković’s narrator can be ironic, a jester, almost never sarcastic, who consistently respects the author’s basic idea and main summary line, profusely using an inexhaustible source of tradition and people’s spirit, and verbal gags in the form of words and sentences, only with more loveliness and clarity in the author’s tales than in public communication. Those gags sometimes appear in a far more important role, as a substitute for the punchline. The theme of Uskoković’s stories is as rich as the life that inspires the author—social differences, inflation, moral and social deviations, bureaucracy and bureaucratic lingo, pettiness, alienation, two-facedness, all kinds of human and social flaws.”

Rastko Zakić: “Dragan Uskoković deeply understands the contrasts and paradoxes of the people’s soul, which eagerly enters his stories, seeking catharsis and an explanation for its disorientation in time. Instead of rebellion and resistance, there is suffering; sorrow is internal and intimate; crying is for one’s own soul. What dominates is Uskoković’s grief for values that irretrievably disappear before the gust of everyday life, packed with troubles and disorientations amidst the new order of civilization. Being contemporary to postmodernism, Uskoković, in a special and unusual way, contributes to this literary movement, using his famous monodrama Čegović as a template for a wonderful new interpretation of a similar subject in the story named Đina. In Đina, the highest level of literary inspiration was achieved—how to say something with the skill of meaning, humorous cleansing and wisely avoiding words that might undo fragile boundaries of mutual tolerance in the jaws of life.”

Dr Raško Jovanović: “(Uskoković) humorously portrays the Montenegrin mentality and a man devout to patriarchal culture, through the carefully constructed course of the story, which isn’t deprived of satirical accents—his confrontation to the phenomenons of modern civilization which he does not understand and rejects. Creative process is based, above all, on the lexicon, built precisely and authentically, and the realisation that our man, from our environment, basically speaking, practices ‘actor’ way of speaking, which is dominated by wits over ‘those above’, a so-called ‘heroics’, where the aforementioned man is undisputed winner. Uskoković in his story Prispjenak, in a manner typical for Nušić, shows resistance—in this case a young man resisting marriage—and his desire to avoid that and stay free. The act, the drama, it all allows the comedian a process to shed light upon the topic and heroes of our time."

Dr Mihailo Šćepanović: “On a linguistic level, Uskoković skilfully uses all that is given by the language itself. Starting from dual pronunciation (ekavski and ijekavski dialect), superdialectic use of the consonant H, as needed, it’s dialectic substituting i omitting; the clear intent that phonetic characteristics, such as regressive assimilation, should not be omitted, which altogether fulfills the entire stylishness of the message—by portraying rural origin of its actors from a wide Montenigrin space.”
