= Bjelotići =

- Village
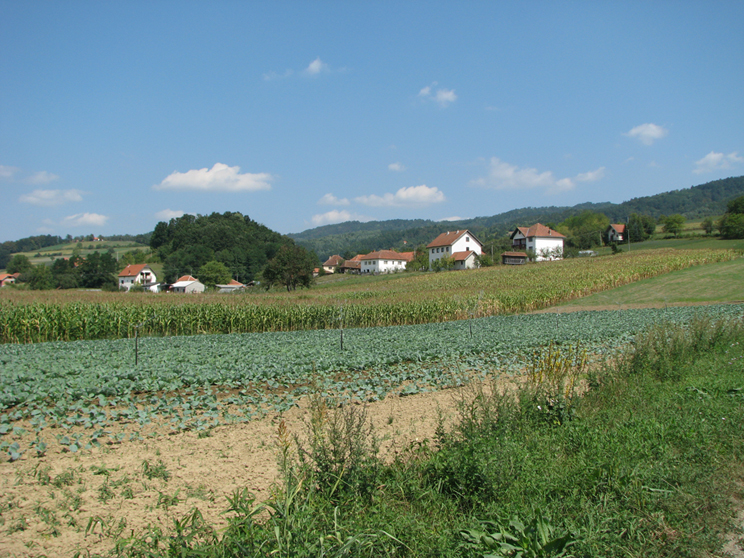
- Panoramic view of Bjelotići

- Location within Serbia
- Coordinates: 43°54′N 19°57′E
- Country: Serbia

Population (2011)
  - Total: 185
- Time zone: UTC+1 (CET)
  - Summer (DST): UTC+2 (CEST)

Bjelotići (Serbian Cyrillic: Бјелотићи) is a village located in the Užice municipality of Serbia. In the 2011 census, the village had a population of 185.
