= Volujac (Užice) =

- Village
- Location within Serbia
- Coordinates: 44°36′N 19°35′E
- Country: Serbia

Population (2011)
  - Total: 922
- Time zone: UTC+1 (CET)
  - Summer (DST): UTC+2 (CEST)

Volujac (Serbian Cyrillic: Волујац) is a village located in the Užice municipality of Serbia. In the 2011 census, the village had a population of 922.
