= Strmac (Užice) =

- Village
- Location within Serbia
- Coordinates: 43°51′28″N 19°38′16″E
- Country: Serbia
- Time zone: UTC+1 (CET)
  - Summer (DST): UTC+2 (CEST)

Strmac (Serbian Cyrillic: Стрмац) is a village located in the Užice municipality of Serbia. According to the 2011 census, the village had a population of 228 people.

== Demographics ==
In the 2002 census, the village had a population of 296 people.
