= Duboko, Bosnia and Herzegovina =

Duboko
- Village
- Location within Bosnia and Herzegovina
- Coordinates: 44.127949°N 17.667791°E
- Country: Bosnia and Herzegovina
- Entity: Federation of Bosnia and Herzegovina
- Canton: Central Bosnia
- Municipality: Novi Travnik

Area
  - Total: 1.73 sq mi (4.47 km^{2})

Population (2013)
  - Total: 178
  - Density: 103/sq mi (39.8/km^{2})
- Time zone: UTC+1 (CET)
  - Summer (DST): UTC+2 (CEST)

Duboko is a village in the municipality of Novi Travnik, Bosnia and Herzegovina.

== Demographics ==
According to the 2013 census, its population was 178.

Ethnicity in 2013
Ethnicity	Number	Percentage
Bosniaks	143	80.3%
Serbs	3	1.7%
Croats	1	0.6%
other/undeclared	31	17.4%
Total	178	100%
