= Duboko, Užice =

Duboko
- Village
- Location within Serbia
- Coordinates: 44°11′N 19°24′E
- Country: Serbia

Population (2011)
  - Total: 848
- Time zone: UTC+1 (CET)
  - Summer (DST): UTC+2 (CEST)

Duboko (Serbian Cyrillic: Дубоко) is a village located in the Užice municipality of Serbia. In 2011, the village had a population of 848.
