= Drijetanj =

Drijetanj Дријетањ
- Village
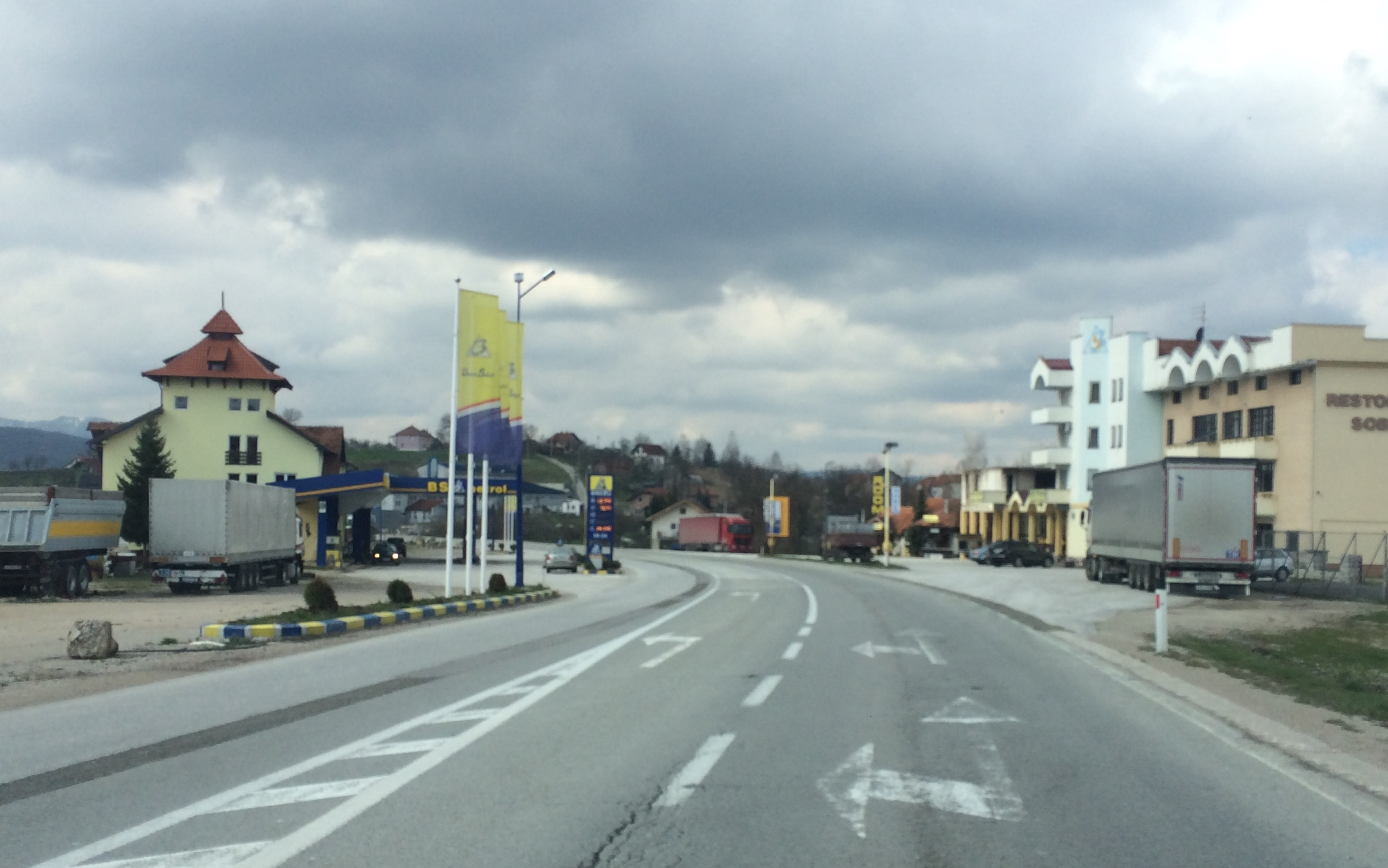
- Main road through Drijetanj

- Location within Serbia
- Coordinates: 43°49′54.12″N 19°47′12.84″E
- Country: Serbia
- Region: Šumadija and Western Serbia
- District: Zlatibor
- Municipality: Užice
- Time zone: UTC+1 (CET)
  - Summer (DST): UTC+2 (CEST)

Drijetanj (Serbian Cyrillic: Дријетањ) is a village located in the Užice municipality of Serbia. In the 2022 census, the village had a population of 1284.

== Geography ==
Drijetanj is located 10 km south-west from Užice, in the Mačkat karst field, between the river Đetinja and the road from Užice to Čajetina. The village is situated between 700 and 820 metres above sea level, and it has an area of 925 ha. It is divided into two parts — the new and old, and is considered a semi-clustered village.

== History ==
A 1476 mention of a village by the name of Dućina is presumed to refer to Drijetanj. Its population has varied throughout history — for example, in 1818, it had 12 homes, but by 1837, it has 23. In the latter 18th and earlier 19th centuries, a wave of Serbian settlers arrived in the village from Montenegro, for example from Pljevlja, but also from Nova Varoš, Prijepolje, and villages around Zlatibor. Electricity was brought to the village in 1950.

== Culture ==
The slavas of Saint Nicholas, Saint Elijah and the Feast of the Ascension are celebrated in Drijetanj. The village also has several monuments: to Dragojlo Dudić and Želimir Đurić, to the Republic of Užice, as well a memorial well dedicated to fallen soldiers between 1912 and 1918. The latter was built in 1935 and renovated in 2006, and bears an image of King Alexander I on its front.

The village has a primary school originally established in 1936, which moved into a new building in 1948. The old building burnt down in a fire in 2022.
