= Bjeluša =

- Village
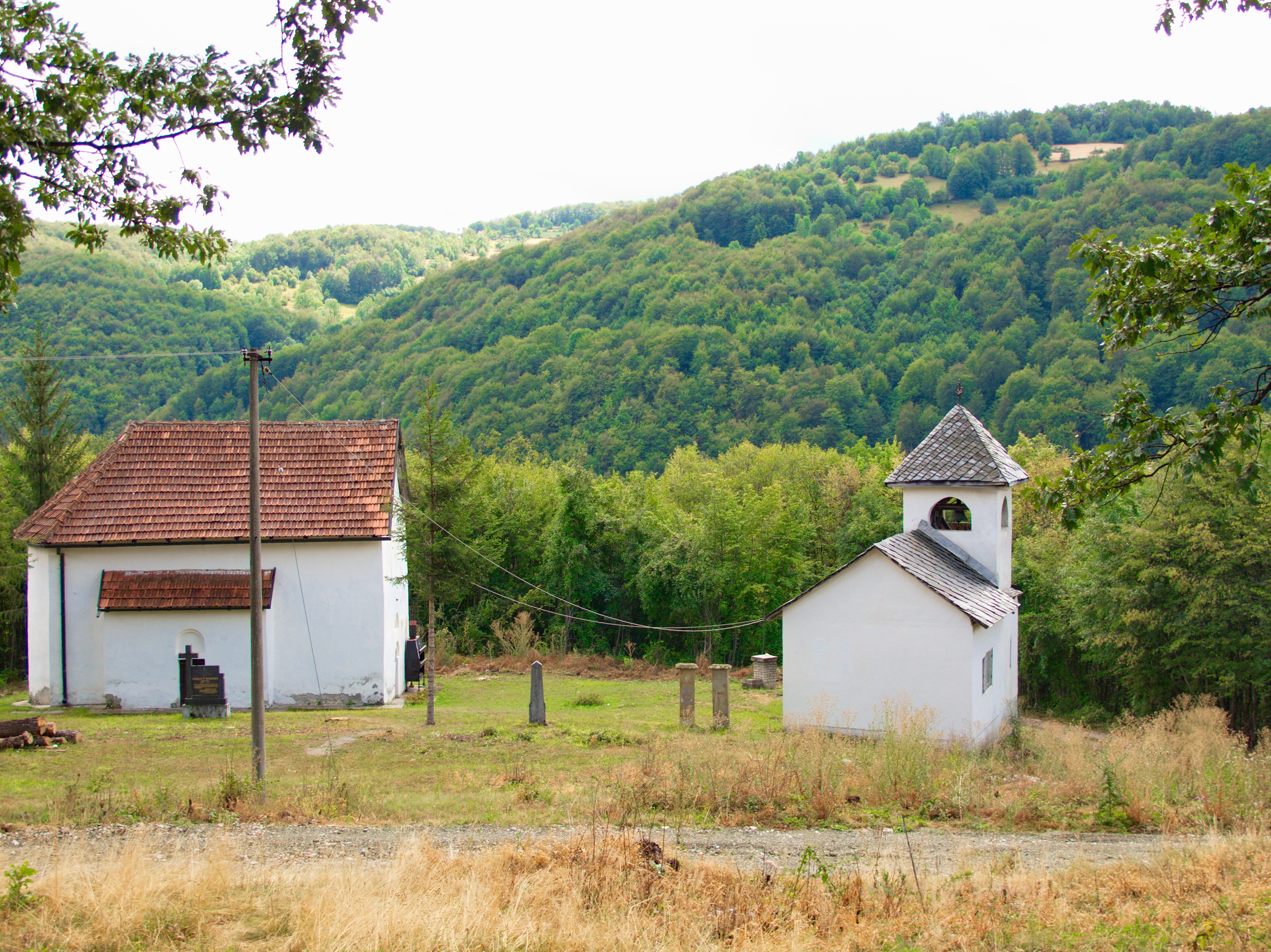

- Location within Serbia
- Coordinates: 43°53′N 19°22′E
- Country: Serbia
- District: Zlatibor
- Municipality: Arilje

Area
  - Total: 35.56 km^{2} (13.73 sq mi)
- Elevation: 921 m (3,022 ft)

Population (2011)
  - Total: 452
  - Density: 12.7/km^{2} (32.9/sq mi)
- Time zone: UTC+1 (CET)
  - Summer (DST): UTC+2 (CEST)

Bjeluša is a village in the municipality of Arilje, Serbia. According to the 2011 census, the village has a population of 452 people.
