= Milutin Uskoković =

Serbian writer and soldier (1884–1915)

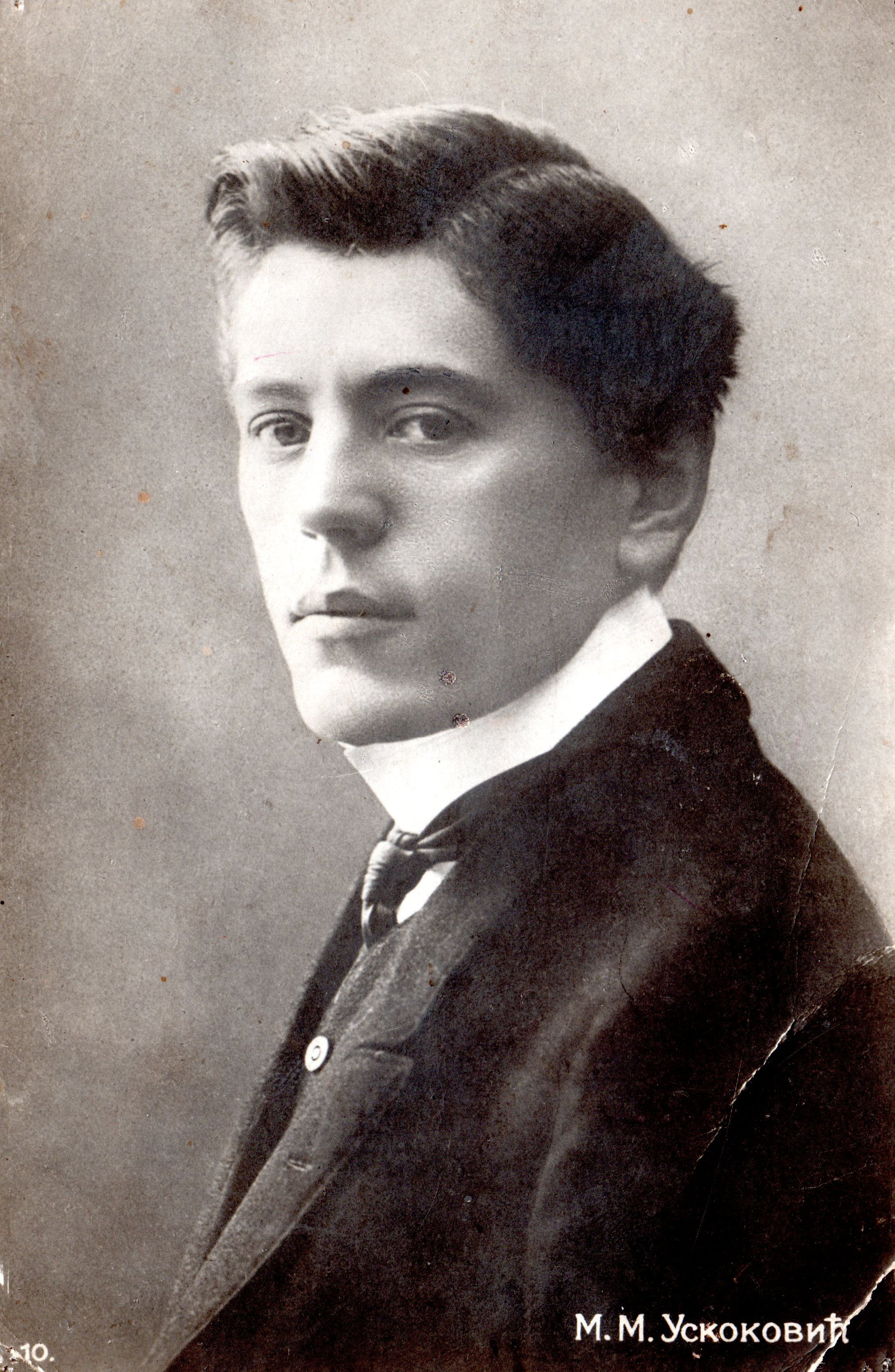
- Born: 4 June 1884; Užice, Serbia
- Died: 15 October 1915 (aged 31); Kuršumlija, Serbia
- Education: University of Geneva
- Occupation: Writer

Milutin Uskoković (Serbian Cyrillic: Милутин Ускоковић; 4 June 1884 – 15 October 1915) was a Serbian novelist, short story writer and soldier.

== Biography ==
Milutin Uskoković was born at Užice, Serbia, on 4 June 1884 and killed himself at Kuršumlija in southern Serbia on 15 October 1915 while witnessing the tragic retreat of the Serbian army. His suicide note read: "I can no longer endure the destruction of my fatherland!"

He graduated from University of Geneva's Law School with a Doctor of Jurisprudence degree in 1910.

Like Veljko Miličević, Uskoković mixed fiction with journalism. He served as a war correspondent embedded with the Serbian army in the Balkans Wars and in World War I.

As a novelist and short-story writer, Uskoković came to hold definite theories of the purpose and value of fiction, which he set forth in the essays collected after his death. He wrote, "Crtice" (1901) and poems in prose "Pod životom" (1905) and "Vitae freagmenta" (1908). His short stories "Kad ruže cvetaju" (1911) first appeared in magazines. Then two novels came, "Čedomir Ilić," published in 1914, and "Došljaci," published posthumously in 1919.

== Works ==
- Pod životom : crtice, pesme u prozi, pesme, članci o književnosti, 1905
- Vitae fragmenta, 1908
- Došljaci (Settlers), his first novel, 1910
- Kad ruže cvetaju, 1912
- Les traites d Union douaniere en droit international, 1910
- Čedomir Ilić, his second novel, 1914
- Dela, 1932
- Usput, 1978

== Sources ==
- Jovan Skerlić, Istorija nove srpske književnosti (Belgrade, 1914/1921) page 466
