= Stari Grad, Užice =

Medieval fortress in Užice, Serbia

Old town Stari Grad
- Užice, Serbia
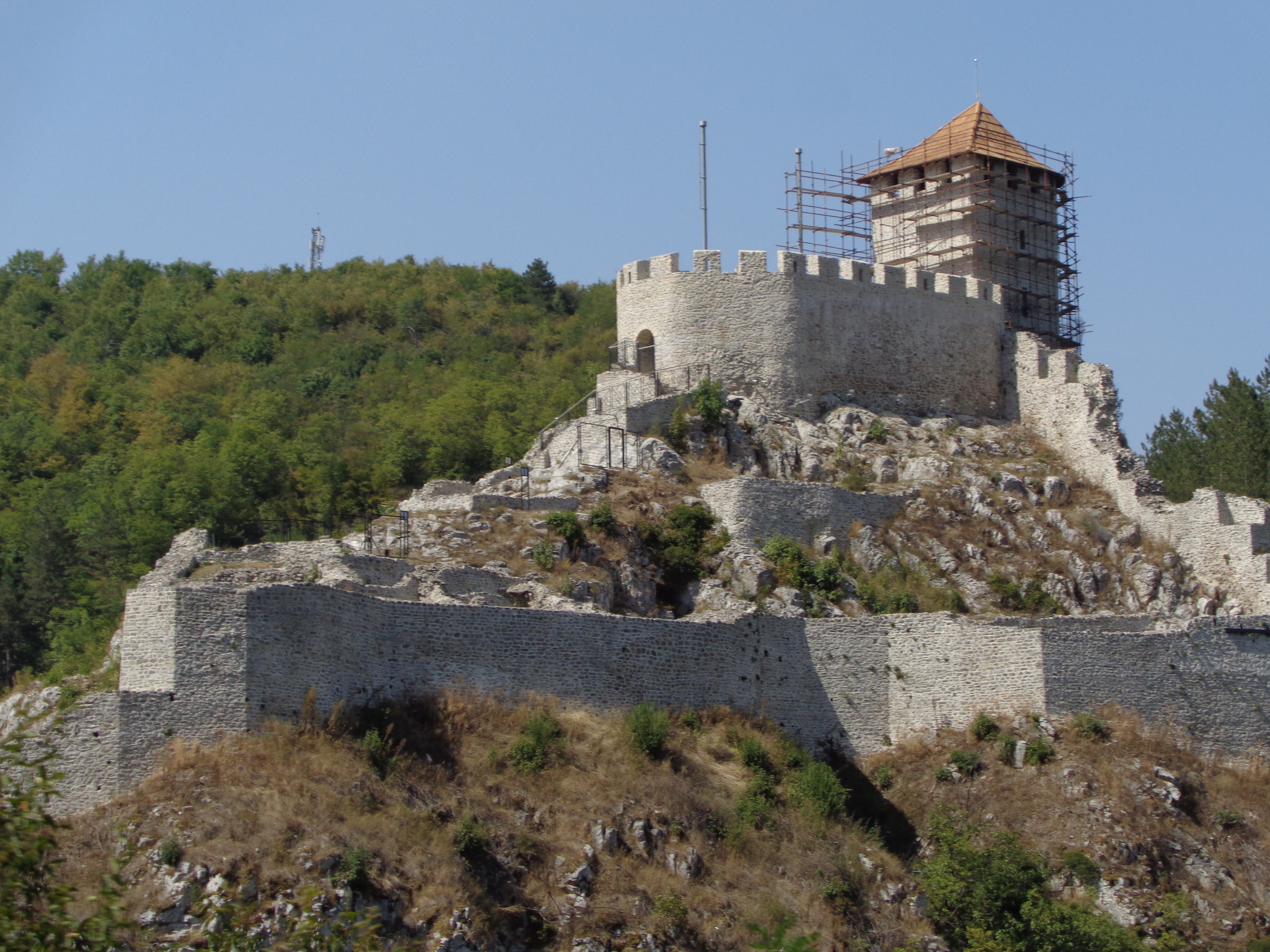
- Reconstruction of Stari Grad in Užice (2020)

Site information
- Type: Fortification
- Open to the public: Yes

Location
- Coordinates: 43.852°N 19.829°E

Site history
- Built: 12th-13th century
- Materials: Stone

Stari Grad (Serbian Cyrillic: Стари Град, pronounced [stâːriː ɡrâd], "Old Town") is a medieval fortress located on a high, steep cliff overlooking the city of Užice, in central Serbia. For centuries, it lay in ruins, but has been undergoing a major reconstruction project. The first phase, the restoration of the citadel (Upper Town), was completed and opened to visitors in late 2023, while work continues on other parts of the complex, such as the Water Tower.

The fortress is an example of typical medieval Serbian architecture. It is believed to have been built in the second half of the 14th century to control movement along nearby roads and the town of Užice itself. Stari Grad was declared a Monument of Culture of Great Importance in 1983, and it is protected by the Republic of Serbia. It is considered a major symbol of Užice and its long history.

== Location ==
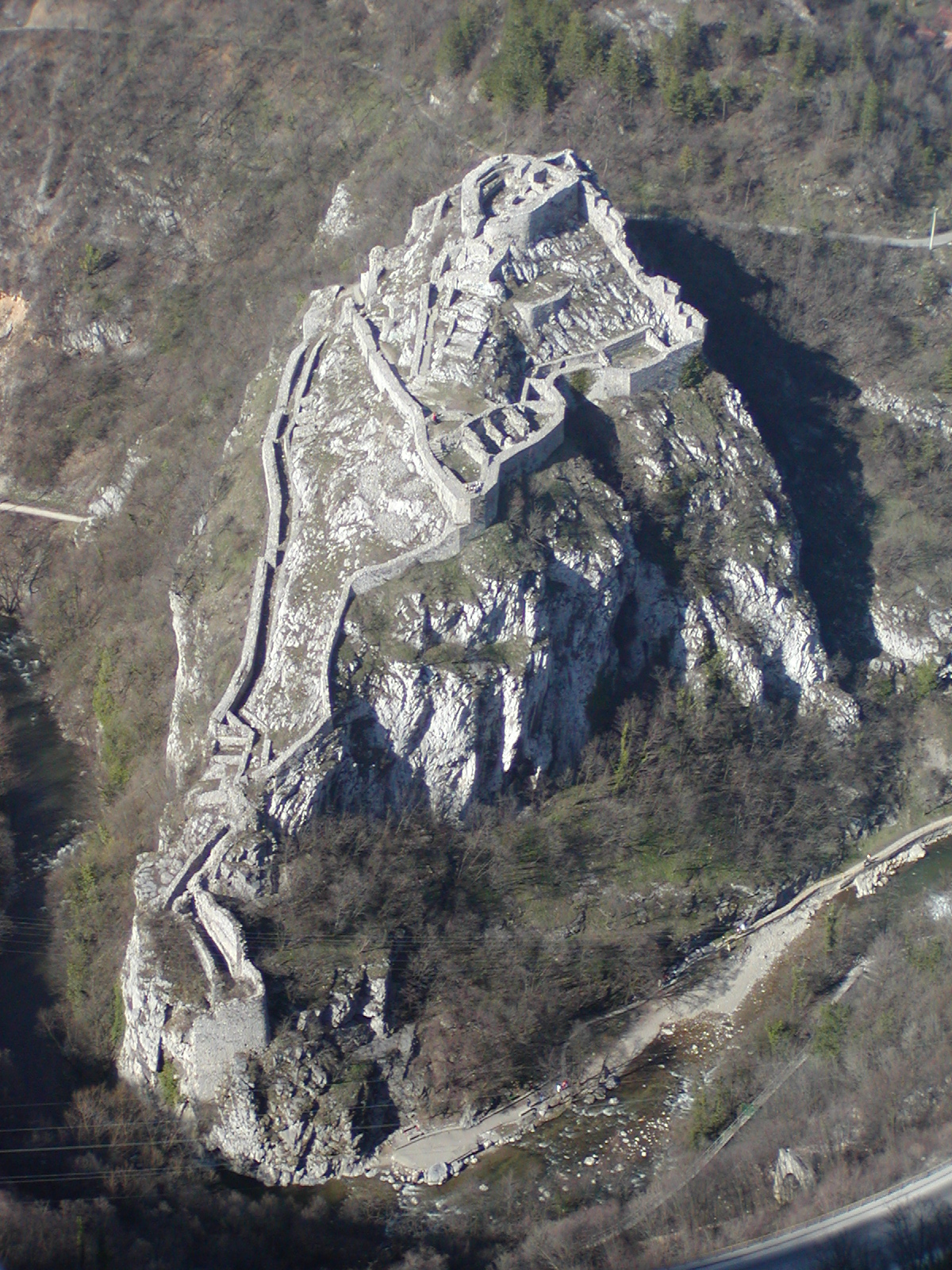
An aerial view of Stari Grad before reconstructions

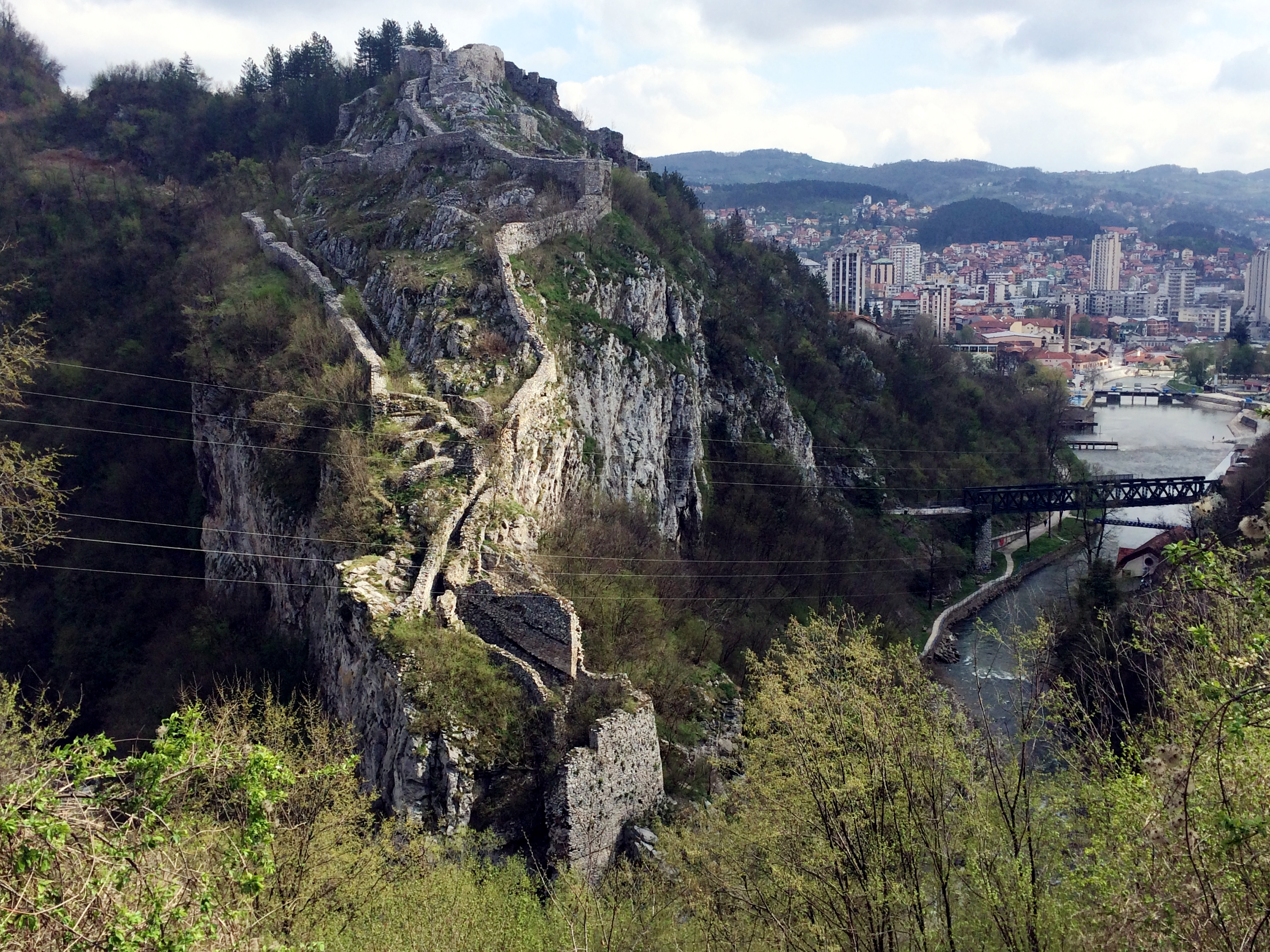
View on the Stari Grad (left), modern town of Užice (upper right), and the Đetinja river (right

The fortress is located on top of the tall, steep rocky hill which sharply declines into the Đetinja river. The river meanders around the rock, surrounding the fortress from three sides and protecting it. The fortress actually sits on a cliff, elevated above the final section of the deep canyon-like gorge of the Đetinja. It is situated on the river's left bank.

== History ==
=== Prehistory ===
The area was inhabited for millennia. Remains of prehistoric settlements are found in the Đetinja gorge and around it. There are two major location. The Staparska Gradina, near the Stapari village was thoroughly explored in the late 1950s when the three levels of human habitation were discovered. The lowest and oldest are dated into the Neolithic. The middle level corresponds to the Vinča-Pločnik culture and the third one belongs to the Bronze Age. The dugouts were discovered in the oldest levels, but also the above-ground dwelling objects from the later periods. Another one is the Rimsko groblje ("Roman cemetery"). It hasn't been explored much, but the remnants of the large, above-ground and regularly shaped stone plates were discovered. In 2015 the local population built a public drinking fountain at the site.

=== Medieval ===
The fortress was built in the second half of the 14th century by the local Vojinović noble family, which ruled the vast areas from Rudnik, over Polimlje, Podrinje, east Herzegovina with Trebinje, to Konavle and Dračevica, neighboring the Republic of Dubrovnik. It was built both as the ruling seat and to protect Užice itself and the caravan road which connected the Morava Valley with Bosnia, Hum, Adriatic coast and Dubrovnik, via the valley of the Đetinja river.

The citadel was probably built during the rule of Nikola Altomanović. It had the stone tower, while the rest of the fortified complex was most likely wooden. Historically, the most important event in the history of the fortress happened in November 1373. United forces of Altomanović's neighbors, Prince Lazar of Serbia, on the east, and King Tvrtko I of Bosnia, on the west, attacked him. Their coalition was supported by the Hungarian units sent by King Louis I of Hungary and headed by the ban of Mačva, Nicholas I Garai. During the short siege of the fortress, the coalition used cannons and siege engines which forced Altomanović to surrender. Nobleman Stefan Musić, with silent approval from his commander and maternal uncle Lazar, blinded Altomanović. After the battle, Lazar and Tvrtko divided Altomanović's lands.

The fortress remained Serbian until 1459 when it was conquered by the Ottomans, though it was rarely mentioned in this period. The Ottomans reconstructed the fortress, also expanding it.

=== Modern ===
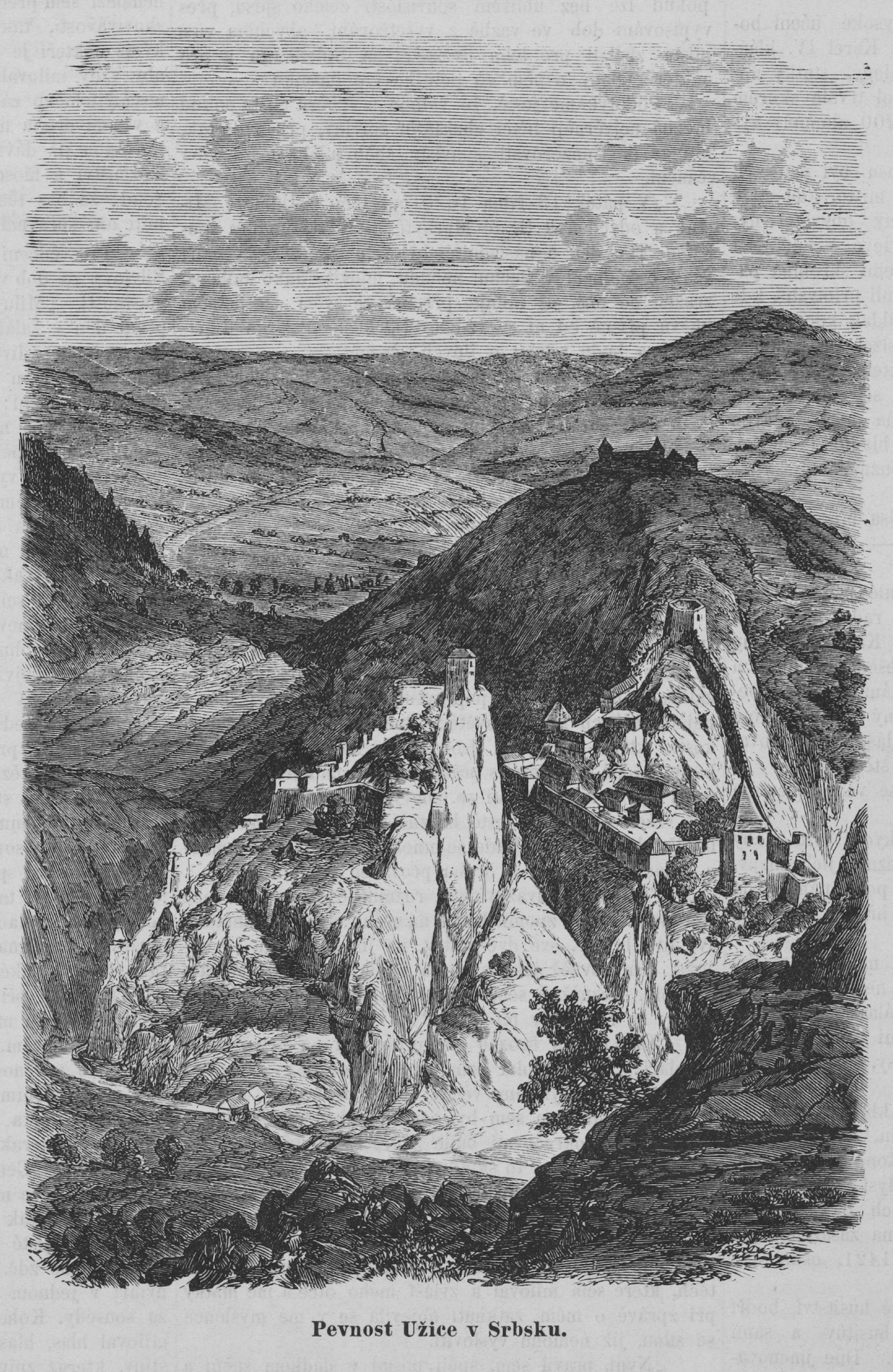
Illustration of Stari Grad in Užice, 1864

A detailed account on the fort was left by the Ottoman traveler Evliya Çelebi who spent three days in the fort in 1664:

It is a nice town on the bank of the Đetinja river, lying on the precipitous and high rock. It is built in the rectangular shape. Its range is 3,100 steps. It has 41 towers around, and on the ramparts there are 4,000 bastions. City walls are 40 cubits tall, and as all on four sides there are steep, precipitous boulders and chasms like a hellish abyss, there are no moats on any of the sides. In the part of the city where the Đetinja flows, the architect built a large and tall tower and let, from the town to the Đetinja, 80 fathoms long rope, winding it on the winch so that enemy absolutely can't see when the water is being taken out of the Đetinja. In town there are only 10 houses which belong to: town commander, priest, administrator, music chief, small mosque, ammunition magazine and food storage. There are no other buildings. It has a triple gate facing north.

The fortress remained like this until the 17th century, when, due to the Austro-Turkish wars, the fortification was again expanded and upgraded. After the Austrian withdrawal in 1738 following another war, the Turks again reconstructed the fort, including the citadel's tower. With Austrian incursions and Serbian rebellions, the fortress was in this period variously held by the Ottomans, Austrians and Serbs.

By the protocols of the 1862 Kanlıca Conference, the Turks had to evacuate some of the fortresses they held in, now, autonomous Serbia. There were six in total, and one of them was Užice. The protocols, signed by the ruling Prince Mihailo Obrenović, also stipulated that the abandoned fortresses had to be demolished and made unusable for any future military purpose. The fort was mined and destroyed in January 1863.

=== Reconstruction ===
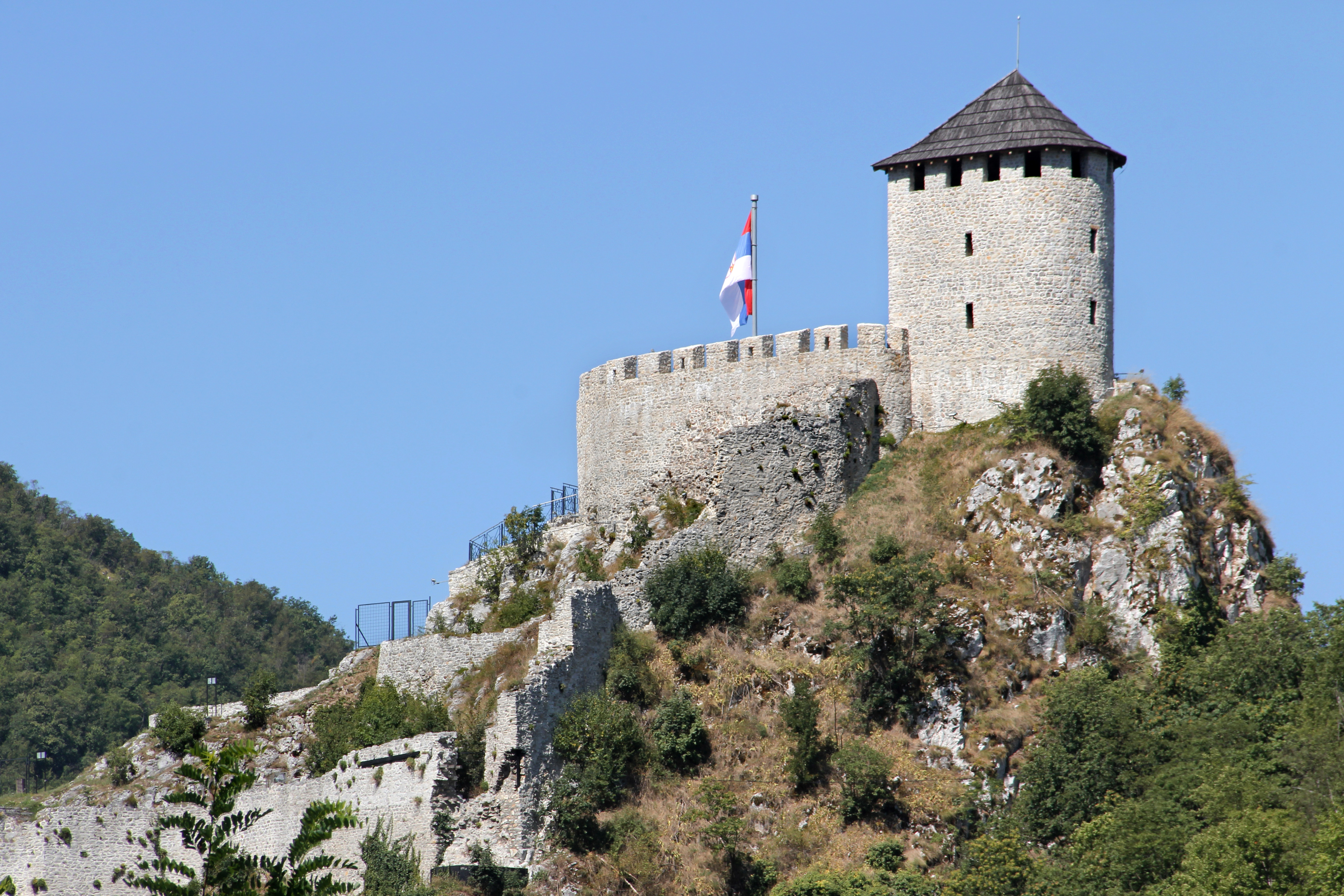
The reconstructed citadel (Upper Town) of the fortress

After decades of being an inaccessible ruin, a multi-phase reconstruction project began with the aim of preserving the fortress and opening it to the public. The fortress complex consists of three main parts: the Upper, Middle, and Lower Town.

The first phase of the project, focusing on the complete restoration of the citadel (Upper Town), was completed in late 2023. This phase included the conservation of the walls, archeological research, and the construction of pathways and a visitors' center to make the site safe and accessible. Work has since continued on the Middle Town, with a significant focus on rebuilding the Water Tower, a dominant six-story structure within the fortress walls. Future plans include the full restoration of the Middle and Lower Towns of the complex.

== Characteristics ==
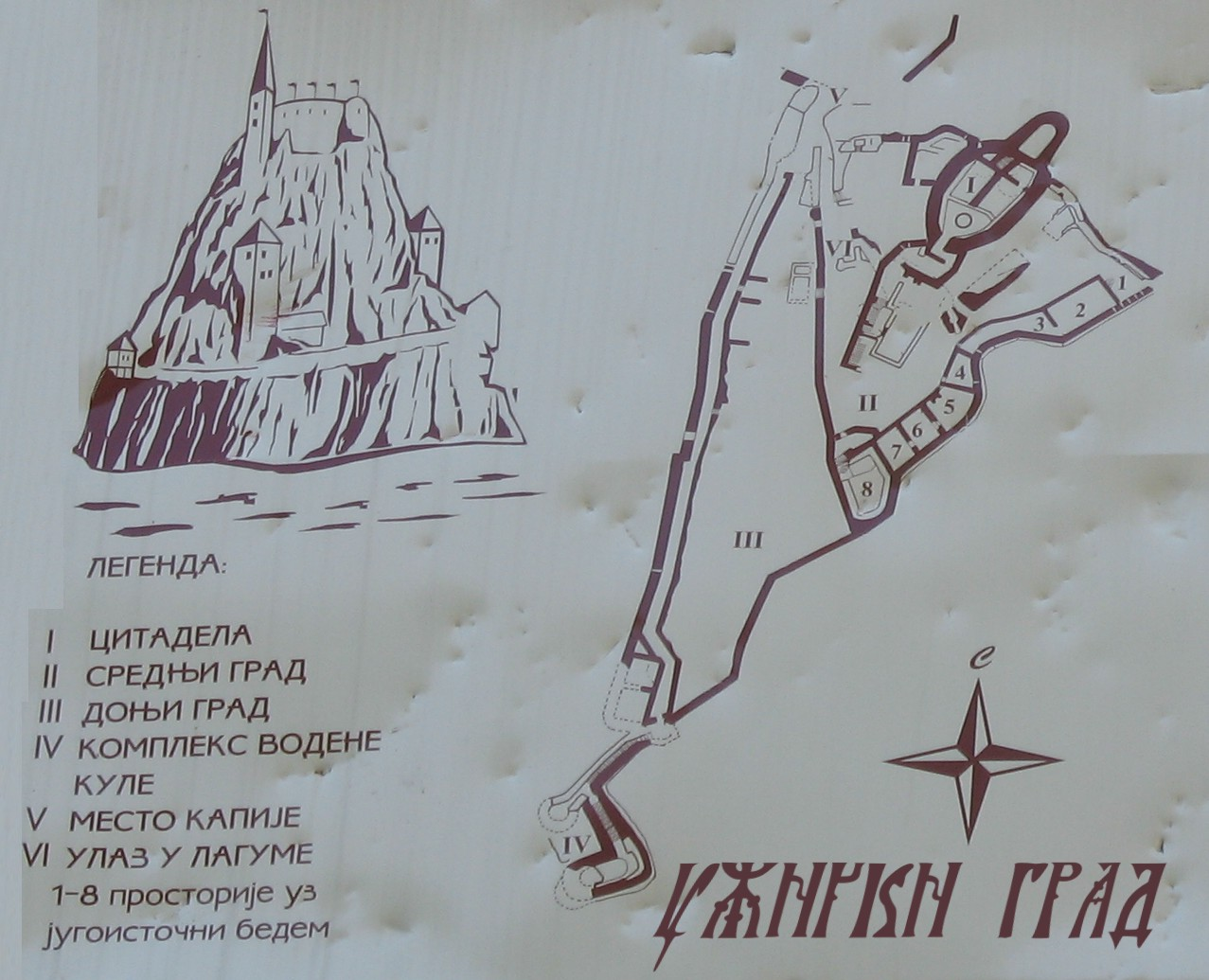
Fort legend

Stari Grad is a typical medieval fortress built for the melee weapon fighting. The base is elongated and irregularly shaped, which was needed to adjust it to the topographic relief. Smaller section of the town was located at the highest point. It was isolated and well fortified, with ramparts including the donjon. The other, lower part of the town, was encircled by the walls which descended along the ridge's edge all the way to the river. On its bank, there was a water tower, which supplied the town. The town is divided in three sections: upper town, middle town and lower (or water) town. Although the smallest, the upper town is the most visible.

The entrance into the fort is located on the northwest side. The inner space directly from the entrance was a fortified outer bailey. South of the entrance there are remains of the lagums, underground rooms. There are two of them, embedded into the rock and interconnected. They served as the shelter and a weapons magazine.

The ramparts elevate up to 80 m (260 ft) above the river. The upper town was connected to the lowest section at the Đetinja bank with 168 steps. The fortress allows for an excellent overview on the entire Užice depression and the western section of the West Pomoravlje.

== Reconstruction ==
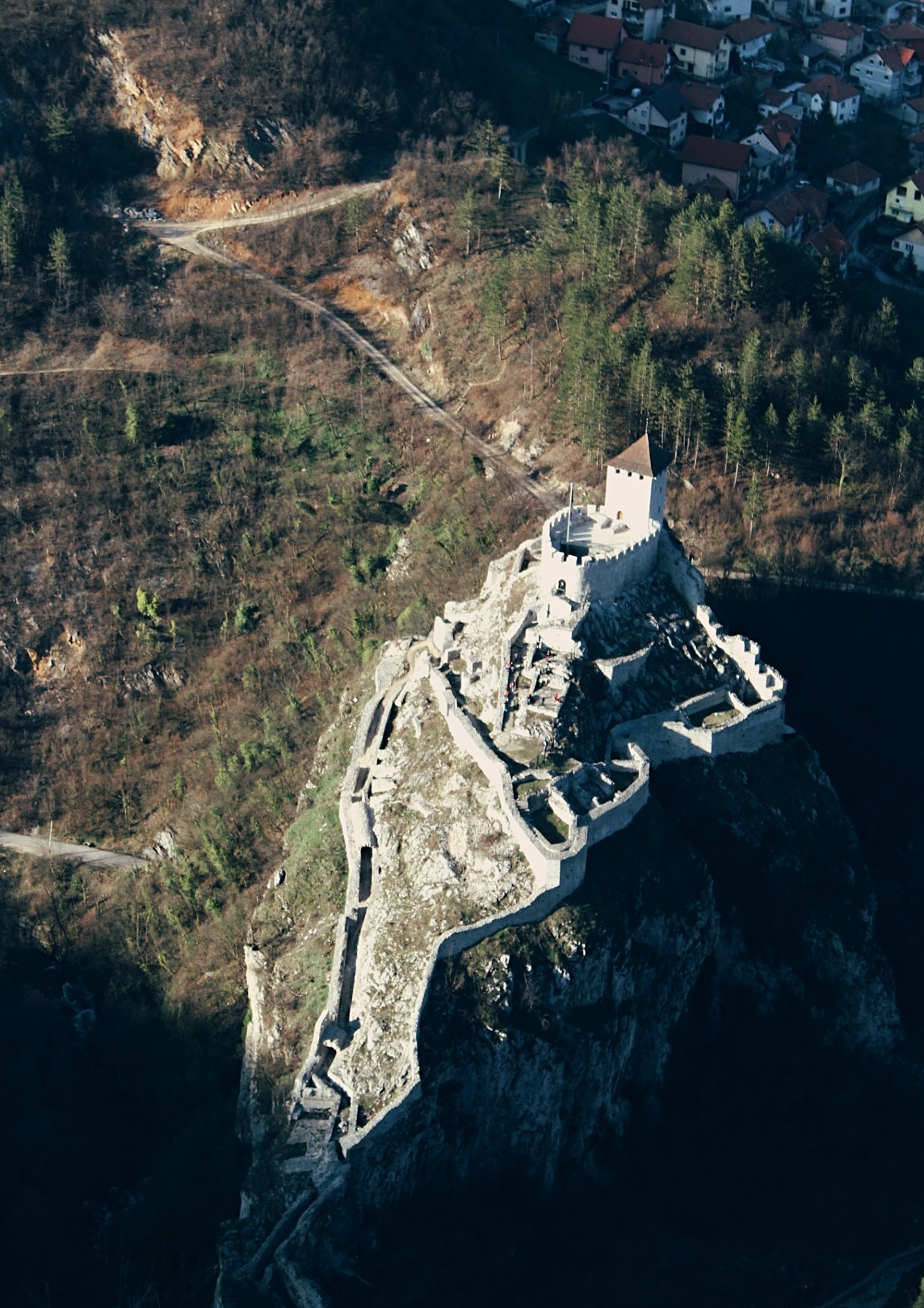
An aerial view of Stari Grad after reconstructions

Works, which included the archaeological survey, conservation and partial restoration were conducted from 1973 to 1984. Cleaning of the fortress from garbage and overgrowth began in 2014. Cleaning and minor preparations continued until 2016 when the decision on reconstructing the remains was announced. Basically a continuation of the 1980s works, the reconstruction ensued in August 2017. The reconstruction of the upper town, middle town and water tower was planned. Part was to be conserved and part should be repaired.

In 2017 and 2018 the upper town and parts of the middle town were conserved in order the prevent further decay. Partially reconstructed citadel's tower was adapted into the scenic viewpoint. A possible modernization of the feature, which would include the bridge connecting the fortress with the Zlatibor road, cable car, museum, hotel, etc., was also considered by the city administration.

In May 2019 it was confirmed that the 113 m (371 ft) long pedestrian bridge across the Đetinja to the fortress will be built. The fortress itself was reconstructed and partially rebuilt based on the detailed Austrian plans from 1737 (when Austrians held it for less than 2 years), which have been kept in the War Archive in Vienna. The tower, citadel at the top and the casemate was completely rebuilt.

Works were scheduled to start in the spring of 2020. Concurrently, the projects for the conservation of the remaining part of the middle town and of the entire lower town were drafted. Middle town will be fully reconstructed, with artisan village built within. The citadel tower now hosts artistic exhibitions while the plateau around it serves for various cultural and public gatherings. Better access will be enabled via the bridge to the old gate entrance. The citadel is decorated with lights.

The fortress was opened for visitors in March 2022.

== Tourism ==
The plans are to include the reconstructed fortress into the group of tourist attractions located along the Đetinja. In January 2019 construction of the replica of the Neolithic settlement at Staparska Gradina was announced. The settlement will include dug outs, stilt houses, artisan workshops, etc. Right below the Stari Grad there is a small hydroelectrical power plant on the Đetinja. Named “Pod Gradom” (“Below the town”), it is the oldest one in Serbia and on the Balkans, second oldest in Europe and third oldest in the world after Niagara in United States and was also designed according to Nikola Tesla's principles. It was built only 4 years after the Niagara.

Undeveloped Staparska Banja ("Stapari Spa") with several thermal springs is also located in the gorge. In 2017 a pedestrian and bicycle path was built which reached the spa. Though two pools were constructed and there are swimmers, the spa is basically a mudflat. Thermal waters, with the temperature of 31 °C (88 °F) help with the rheumatism and skin diseases. Along the new path, which follows the route of the former railroad, there are additional, old pathways, dating from the Ottoman period. In July 2017 volunteers organized and cleaned those old paths, removed the overgrowth and made 2.15 km (1.34 mi) of old paths accessible for the pedestrians. The path now starts at the Užice city beach and curves through the natural environment for 5 km (3.1 mi) to Staparska Banja. In September 2017, as the first greenway in Serbia, it received the 2nd prize at the 8th European Greenways Awards.

== See also ==
- Protected Monuments of Culture (Serbia)
- List of fortresses in Serbia
- Tourism in Serbia

== Bibliography ==
- Fine, John Van Antwerp (1994). The Late Medieval Balkans: A Critical Survey from the Late Twelfth Century to the Ottoman Conquest. Michigan: The University of Michigan Press. ISBN 0472100793.
