= Đetinja =

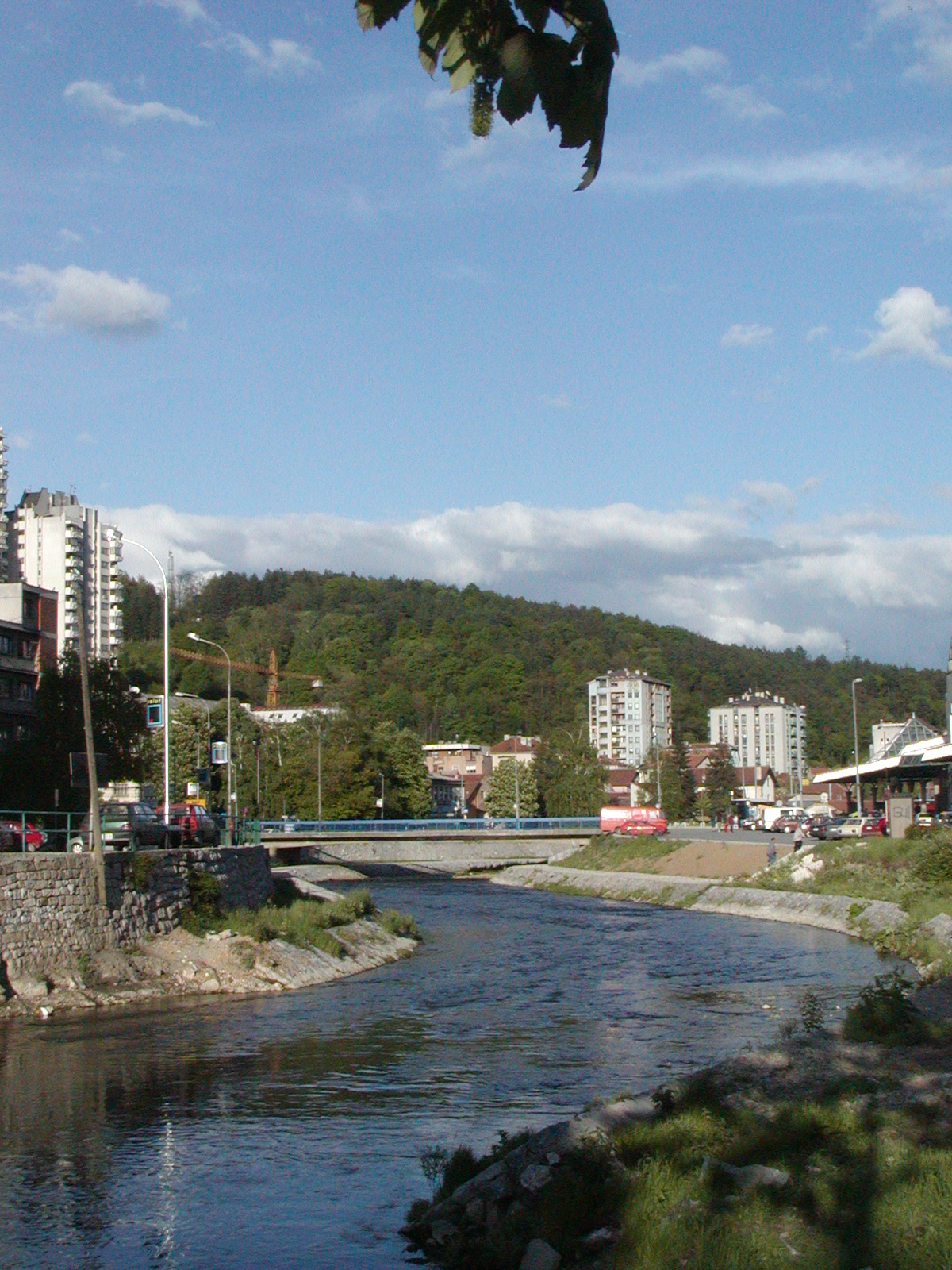
- The river Đetinja as it runs through the city of Užice
- Native name: Ђетиња (Serbian)

Location
- Country: Serbia

Physical characteristics
- Source
  - location: Zlatibor, western Serbia
- Mouth
  - location: with Golijska Moravica makes Zapadna Morava, near Požega, Serbia
  - coordinates: 43.8472°N 20.0731°E
- Length: 75 km (47 mi)
- Basin size: 1,210 km^{2} (470 sq mi)
- Discharge
  - average: 1.93 m^{3}/s (68 cu ft/s) (at Vrutci dam)

Basin features
- Progression: West Morava→ Great Morava→ Danube→ Black Sea

Đetinja (Serbian Cyrillic: Ђетиња; pronounced [d͡ʑě̞tiɲa]) is a river in western Serbia, a 75 km (47 mi) long. The river is the headstream of the Zapadna Morava river.

The Đetinja river valley serves as a corridor for the Belgrade–Bar railway.

== Name ==
The name most likely originates from the old name Cetina, which meant "Horse river", and even today, one of the streams which forms Đetinja is called Konjska reka (transl. Horse river).

According to the local legend, however, the river Đetinja got its name following the apocryphal event in which Ottomans, who ruled these parts at the time, punished the local Užičan people by, as the legend goes, taking their children and throwing them into the river. Thus, the river was named Đetinja rijeka, which in Užičan dialect means the children's river. Later rijeka (river) was dropped from the name, leaving only Đetinja (meaning children's).

== Zlatibor section ==
The Đetinja River, as the Matijaševića reka, originates from the southeastern slopes of the Tara mountain, in western Serbia, near the field of Pusto polje. From the source to its mouth, the river flows in the eastern direction. First, it runs through the small Kremna depression, between the Tara and Zlatibor mountains, following the northern border of Mt. Zlatibor. At Kremna, five streams flow into the one river, forming Đetinja: Matijaševića reka, Konjska reka, Bratešina, Užički potok and Tomića potok.

== Užice section ==
=== Đetinja Gorge ===
Đetinja carved a gorge, 8 km (5.0 mi) long and 300 m (980 ft) deep. At the village of Vrutci, the river is dammed in 1986, creating an artificial Lake Vrutci. The reservoir was supposed to solve the chronic water problems of the fast-growing town of Užice and its industry (in 1961–91, the city population grew by 266%, from 20,060 to 53,310). From the south, Đetinja receives the right tributary of Sušica, coming from the central parts of Zlatibor, and enters the Užice valley.

The gorge is known for numerous caves, sinkholes and cliffs. There are two large caves in this section. One, Megara, is situated in the gorge and the other is Potpećka cave, downstream from Užice. Several hot springs are also located in the gorge, which is also known for its wildlife, including some of the rare and endemic plant species. Also, it is one of the areas in Serbia with the most abundant number of different butterfly species. Out of 192 recorded butterfly species in Serbia, 110 can be found in the Đetinja Gorge. The river itself is inhabited by the various fish species (European chub, common barbel, gudgeon, common nase), but also by the Eurasian otter. Birds include peregrine falcon, northern goshawk, Eurasian sparrowhawk, short-toed snake eagle and numerous passerine birds. Among the mammals present in the gorge there are wild boar, roe deer and fox. Concerning plants, 24 species found in the area are internationally listed as "important", while 6 are rarities. Wildlife blossomed since the 1970s, when the railway tracks were dismantled.

Remains of the several settlements dating from the periods of the earliest development of the civilization are found in the gorge and around it. There are two major finds. The Staparska Gradina, near the Stapari village, is 11 km (6.8 mi) away from Užice. It was thoroughly explored in the late 1950s when the three levels of human habitation were discovered. The lowest and oldest is dated into the Neolithic. The middle level corresponds to the Vinča-Pločnik culture and the third one belongs to the Bronze Age. The dugouts were discovered in the oldest levels, but also the above-ground dwelling objects from the later periods. The artifacts are exhibited in the National Museum in Užice. The other find is the Rimsko groblje ("Roman cemetery"). It hasn't been explored as much as the Staparska Gradina was, but the remnants of the large, above-ground and regularly shaped stone plates. In 2015 locals build a public drinking fountain at the site. In January 2019 plans were announced for the construction of the replica of the Neolithic settlement at Staparska Gradina. The settlement will include dug outs, stilt houses, artisan workshops, etc., and should be finished by the end of 2019. Deadline was then moved to May 2020. Archaeological park "Stapark" was opened on 30 July 2022.

Undeveloped Staparska Banja ("Stapari Spa") with several thermal springs is also located in the gorge. In 2017 a pedestrian and bicycle path was built which reached the spa. Though two pools were constructed and there are swimmers, the spa is basically a mudflat. Thermal waters, with the temperature of 31 °C (88 °F) help with the rheumatism and skin diseases. Along the new path, which follows the route of the former railroad, there are additional, old pathways, dating from the Ottoman period. In July 2017 volunteers organized and cleaned those old paths, removed the overgrowth and made 2.15 km (1.34 mi) of old paths accessible for the pedestrians. The path now starts at the Užice city beach and curves through the natural environment for 5 km (3.1 mi) to Staparska Banja. In September 2017, as the first greenway in Serbia, it received the 2nd prize at the 8th European Greenways Awards.

A ridable miniature railway was organized in 2018. It goes through the gorge, using the revitalized path. The route is 8 km (5.0 mi) long and connects Užice and Staparska Banja. The thermal springs were used in Roman times. A project on revitalizing the spa and its surroundings was drafted in 2018. Since the summer of 2020, the kayaking on the river is allowed. It is organized in the section from the gorge's exit to the dam before Užice.

=== Užice Fortress ===
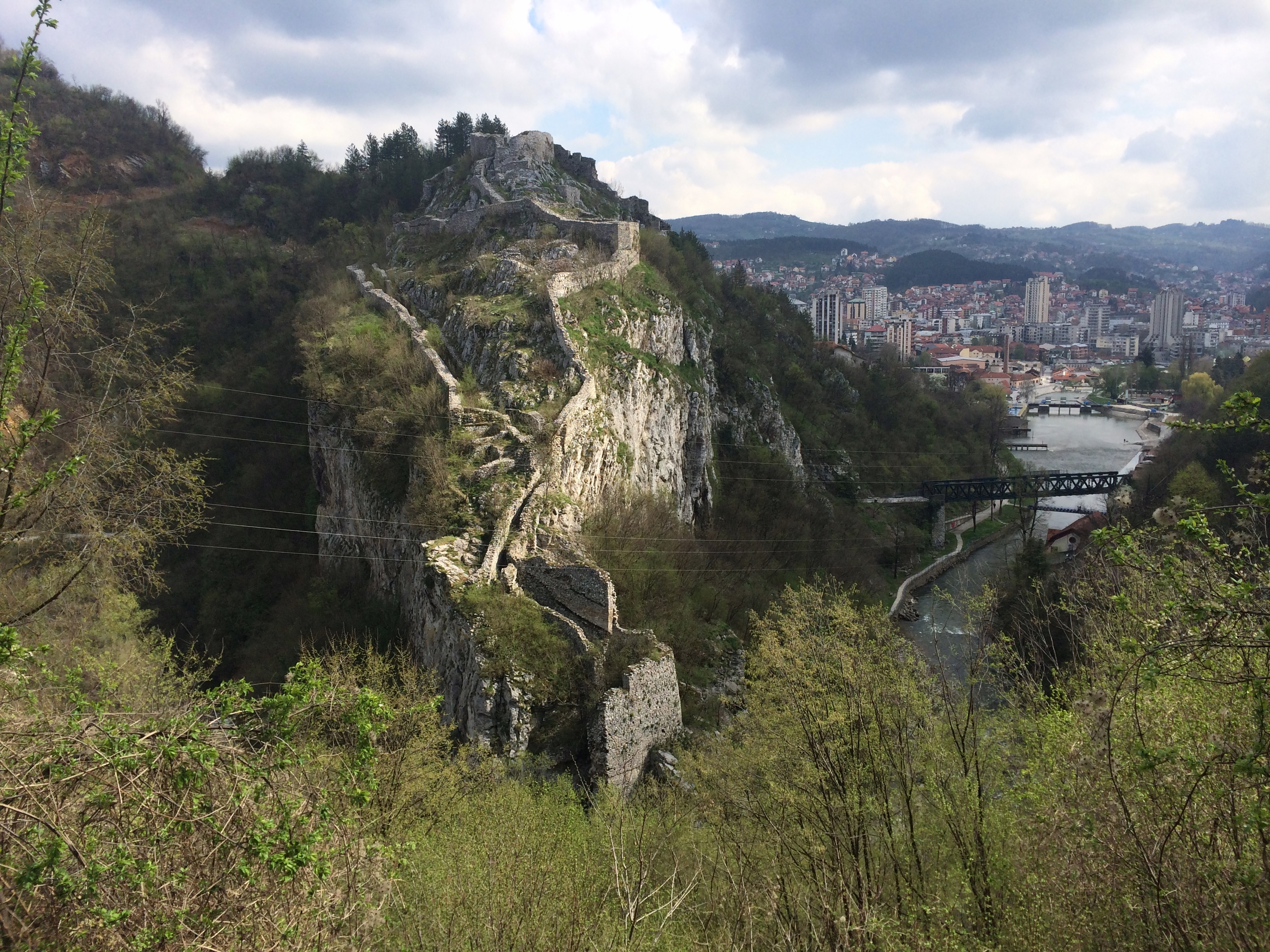
Medieval Užice Fortress

In Užice, Đetinja runs near the remnants of an early mediaeval fortress of Užički Grad located on a steep hill surrounded by deep river canyon-like gorge. The fort originates from the 14th century. The ruins were partially revitalized in the mid-1980s and the next reconstruction, basically a continuation of the 1980s works, ensued in August 2017. For now, the reconstruction of the upper town, middle town and water tower is planned. Part will be conserved and part will be repaired. A possible modernization of the feature, which would include the bridge which would connect the fortress with the Zlatibor road, cable car, museum, hotel, etc., was also considered by the city administration.

When Ottoman traveler Evliya Çelebi visited the area in 1664, he described the fortress "being on the high cliff, like the town of Tokat", adding that "you can't approach it with a military charge as it is under the peak of the abysmal hill on one side, while on the three sides it is surrounded by the river Đetinja, wavy and loud." He also noted that at the time there were over 100 watermills on the river, and six bridges in the Užice area, three wooden and three made of stone.

In May 2019 it was confirmed that the pedestrian bridge across the Đetinja to the fortress will be built. The fortress itself will be reconstructed and partially rebuilt based on the detailed Austrian plans from 1737. The tower, citadel at the top and the casemate will be completely rebuilt.

In 1628, the Kasapčić Bridge was built in to connect Užice's neighborhood of Megdan with the leather tanning facilities on the right side of the river. It was built by Mehmed-beg Kasapčić, hence the name. With five arches, the 54 metres (177 ft) long and 4 metres (13 ft) wide bridge made of dressed tufa, it resembled the famed Mehmed Paša Sokolović Bridge across the Drina, built half a century before. Poet Cari Çelebi wrote a poem dedicate to Mehmed-beg Kasapčić, and the rhymes were engraved on the table which was placed on the bridge. The bridge was mined and demolished by the retreating occupational German army in 1944. At 2017 and 2021 meetings of the Turkish diplomats in Serbia with the Užice administration, the reconstruction of the bridge was announced. City administration stated that the conceptual design for the bridge, little bit shorter than the demolished one, already exists.

=== Old hydroelectric power plant ===
There is also a small hydroelectrical power plant on the Đetinja in Užice, HPP "Pod Gradom" (lit. transl. Under the Old Town / Bellow the Old Town), the oldest one in Serbia and Balkan, second oldest in Europe and third oldest in world after Niagara in United States, built in 1899 and still being in use, but the large hydroelectrical potential of the river is still untapped.

=== City beach ===
Near the Užice city centre, Đetinja is dammed to create a public swimming area, called City Beach (Gradska plaža). Local administration accepted the proposition of the local Friends of the Children Society in April 1959, and the beach was opened by the mayor Rajko Ječmenica on 7 August 1960. Engineers Miladin Pećinar and Vojimir Bojović designed and constructed the dam, respectively. The lake covers 2.5 ha (6.2 acres) and flooded or replaced old swimming locations along the river: Lekin Vir, Kod Debele Vrbe, Kod Četvrte Stene, Plavi Jadran, Pod Bukom, Žuljin Vir, Jaz, Dragova and Fikarova Plaža.

Popular for decades, by the 2020s the number of visitors dwindled almost completely. In the upstream Užice's neighborhood of Turica wastewater was poured directly into the river, polluting the water, so occasionally the swimming is forbidden. Due to the changed technologies in the upstream hydroelectric power plants, they massively dump cold water into the Đetinja, so the water on the beach remains too cold for swimming. Also, several swimming pools, both indoor and outdoor, were opened in the city.

The Đetinja continues through the highly industrialized Užice's suburb of Sevojno and the villages of Gorjani and Potpeće.

== Požega section ==
The river continues on the northern slopes of the Blagaja mountain and the villages of Uzići, Rupeljevo and Rasna and enters the low Tašti field, located between the Blagaja, Krstac and Crnokosa mountains, west of the town of Požega. In the field, the Đetinja receives from the left its main tributary, the Skrapež River, but less than a kilometer after the confluence, it meets the Golijska Moravica River from the south, creating the Zapadna Morava. Since the proximity of the confluences of Đetinja, Skrapež and Golijska Moravica, some sources consider all three rivers to be direct headstreams of the Zapadna Morava. Following the direction of the course, the Đetinja is a natural headstream of the Zapadna Morava, but since Golijska Moravica is 23 kilometres longer, the latter is usually considered as the main headstream.

The Đetinja's drainage area covers 1,210 km^{2} (470 sq mi), it belongs to the Black Sea drainage basin. The river is not navigable.

== Hydroelectricity ==
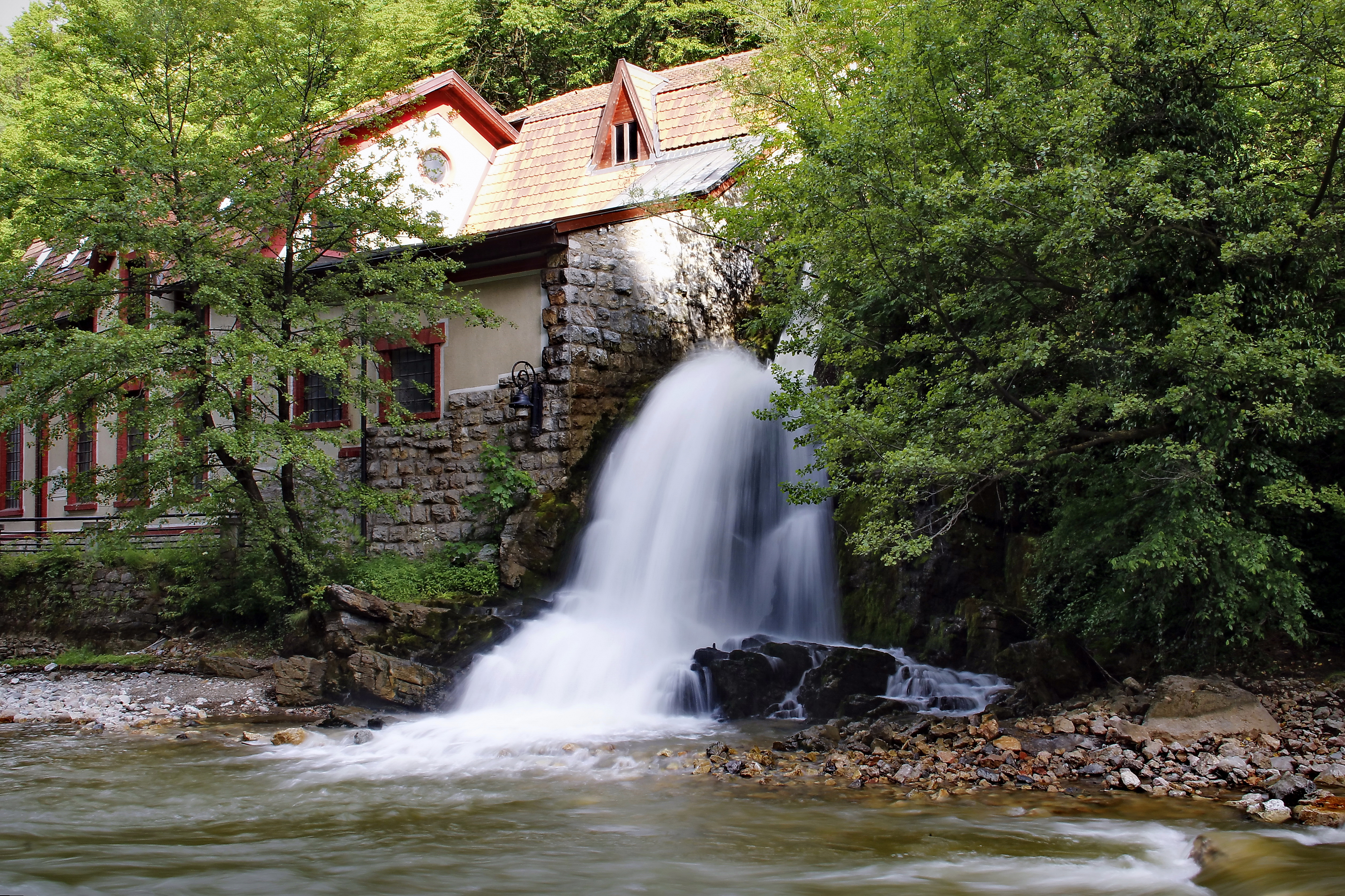
Hydroelectric power plant "Pod Gradom", built in 1899

=== HPP "Pod Gradom" ===
There are two small hydroelectrical power plants on the Đetinja. One is named HPP “Pod Gradom” (lit. transl. Under the Old Town / Bellow the Old Town) and is the oldest one in Serbia and on the Balkans, second oldest in Europe and third oldest in the world after Niagara in United States and was also designed according to Nikola Tesla's principles. Built only 4 years after Niagara, it was constructed by physicist Đorđe Stanojević, a friend of Tesla, and avid advocate of replacement of the gas light with the electric one.

Decision to construct the power plant was adopted on 28 March 1899 by the shareholders of the local Weaving Workshop. The foundation stone was laid in June 1899 by King Alexander I Obrenović. The king used a specially made brass hammer, which is today part of the exhibition. The project was drafted by the engineer Aćim Stevović, while the builder was Josif Granžan, a contractor from Niš. It became operational on Saint Elijah’s Day, 2 August 1900, and is still occasionally in use, using the original Siemens engines from 1900 which were repaired in 2000.

It was an enterprise of a group of Užice's industrialist, which decided to introduce the electricity in order to bust the production and lower the costs. However, the project was quite expensive. Purchase of the equipment, construction of the plant and the city grid cost 215,000 dinars in silver. The equipment was shipped by train from Berlin to Kragujevac, and then by carts through the muddy roads to Užice. The half-automatized plant produces 40 to 60 kW. There was some opposition among the local population, both unfamiliar with and afraid of the electricity. Local stories were saying that the "contraption" is wrongly positioned, that you can't make fire out of the water and how the fire can pass through the wire into the room without setting the house on fire. This changed after the power plant became operational, bringing light to the streets and some of the households, when the inhabitants began to talk about the "light coming out of the river".

The hydro plant is turned into the museum of technics and is placed under the state protection. Reconstruction of the facility began in 2017 and is to be finished in 2018. Aggregates, which are considered to be museum exhibits, will be repaired in a way to keep their authenticity. By October 2018 it was evident that the exterior of the building was changed during the reconstruction and there are plans to add another turbine which will "keep the hydro plant constantly in the system of Elektroprivreda Srbije (EPS)".

However, the reconstruction turned out to be a controversial from several other reasons than changing the appearance of the building. The EPS had no necessary permits, the museum remained closed for visitors, while the main visual feature of the plant, a small overspill waterfall which symbolically marked the end of the gorge, was extinguished. The ministry of construction ordered the EPS on 7 April 2021 to restore things as they were, but as of April 2023 nothing has been done.

=== HPP "Turica" ===
The other power plant on Đetinja is HPP “Turica”, operational since 1 January 1929, but the large hydroelectrical potential of the river is not being used enough. It has two turbines obtained from Germany as World War I reparations. It is located 100 m (330 ft) upstream from the town's beach and was named after the Užice's neighborhood Turica. It is situated between the Belgrade–Bar railway and the surrounding hills. It has two generators of 200 kW each. During the 2017-2018 reconstruction it was updated and revitalized with the new equipment and the process was automatized: outlets, tunnels, pipelines, generators and crane were all revitalized or replaced. Also, the reservoir was cleaned.

Altogether, there are three artificial lakes on the Đetinja: Velika brana, Mala brana and Vrutci.

== Protection ==
=== Gorge ===
In 2016, the process of placing the gorge under the legal protection began. However, the authorities stalled the declaration of the Đetinja Gorge Outstanding Natural Landscape, so the environmentalist groups organized state wide petition in 2021–2022, an announced possible public protests and gatherings if the gorge remains unprotected.

In June 2023, the protection was officially declared by the government. The outstanding natural landscape covers 853 ha (2,110 acres). It includes rich forests of beech, maple and European hop-hornbeam.

One of the major ecological threats is the non-sanitary landfill Godovik near Požega. By 2023 it covered 7 ha (17 acres), stretching along the Đetinja bank. With every stronger rain, the garbage is being washed into the river. Gradual removal of the landfill began in the summer of 2023.

=== Lake Vrutci ===
In 2018, the government placed the area surrounding the Lake Vrutci and the adjoining river course under protection. Three zones of protection were established, covering some 13,000 ha (32,000 acres), with an aim to keep the land in the lake's watershed nonpolluted. The protected area spreads over the territories of the villages Vrutci, Bioska and Kremna, in the Town of Užice, and Tripkova and Šljivovica, in the Čajetina Municipality.

As some villages already developed organic husbandry (goats, poultry), the 2021-20218 plan was devised by the local authorities to massively expand organic agriculture in the protected area. In the hilly areas, the emphasis is on fruits: raspberries, strawberries, blueberries, blackberries, and especially the brandy-varieties of plums (crvena ranka, various Čačak varieties). Apples are also included, with development of individual driers and mini distilleries. The production of organic honey is planned, as the melliferous plants are already present in the protected area. Lowlands are selected for the vegetables and grains, including reintroduction of some old varieties: buckwheat, spelt, corn osmak, small white beans, potato mesečar, garlic, onion, cabbage Serbian melez, and medicinal herbs. Husbandry will include Alpine goat, Sjenica's pramenka sheep, pig Moravka and Naked Neck chicken.

== See also ==
- Uvac
- Tara
- Požega

== Sources ==
- Mala Prosvetina Enciklopedija, Third edition (1985); Prosveta; ISBN 86-07-00001-2
- Jovan Đ. Marković (1990): Enciklopedijski geografski leksikon Jugoslavije; Svjetlost-Sarajevo; ISBN 86-01-02651-6
