= Vrutci =

Vrutci may refer to:

- Vrutci, Serbia, a village near Užice
- Vrutci (Ilijaš), a village in Bosnia and Herzegovina
- Lake Vrutci, a lake in Serbia
