= Prophecy from Kremna =

Collection of prophecies

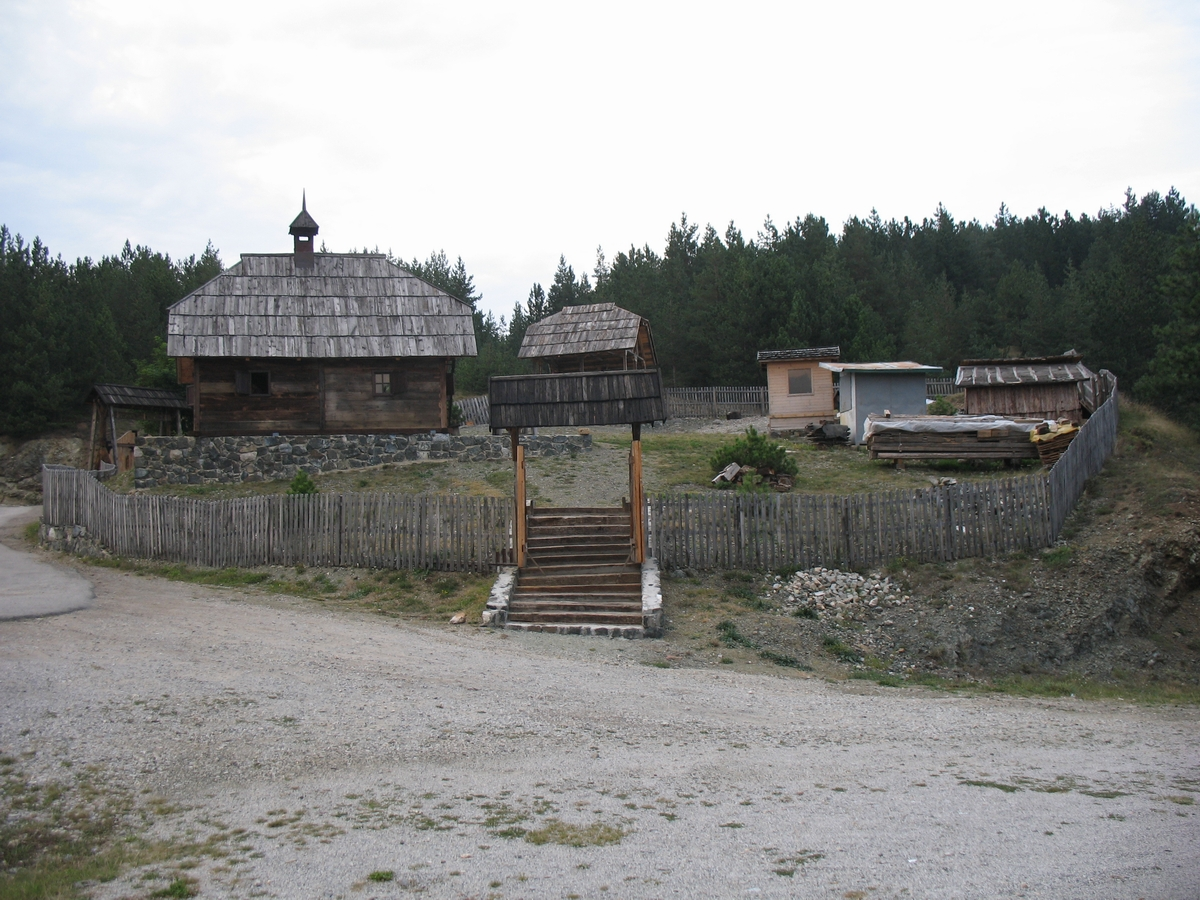
Memorial complex of clairvoyant Tarabići in Kremna near Užice, Serbia.

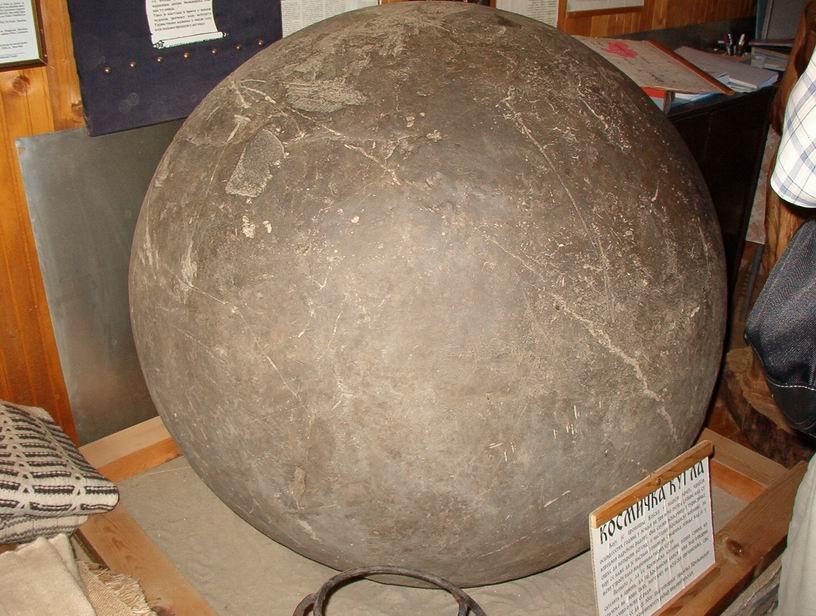
Kremna sphere found under the ground.

The Kremna Prophecies or Prophecy from Kremna are a collection of prophecies purporting to have been written before the twentieth-century events that they describe.

== Origin ==
The Kremna Prophecies originated in the village of Kremna, in Serbia. Illiterate villager Miloš Tarabić (Милош Тарабић) and his nephew Mitar Tarabić (Митар Тарабић, 1829-1899) built a reputation for predicting the future. Their village Serbian Orthodox priest, Zaharije Zaharić (Захарије Захарић, 1836-1918) is said to have recorded their predictions. Both Tarabićes died before 1900.

== Evaluation ==
At least one author has questioned whether the "accurate" prophecies were published in advance of the events they foretell: Voja Antonić (in Serbian) in Kremansko neproročanstvo: studija jedne obmane (Non-Prophecy from Kremna - a study of deception).
