= Stari Han =

Historic building in Kremna, Serbia

- Стари хан (Serbian)
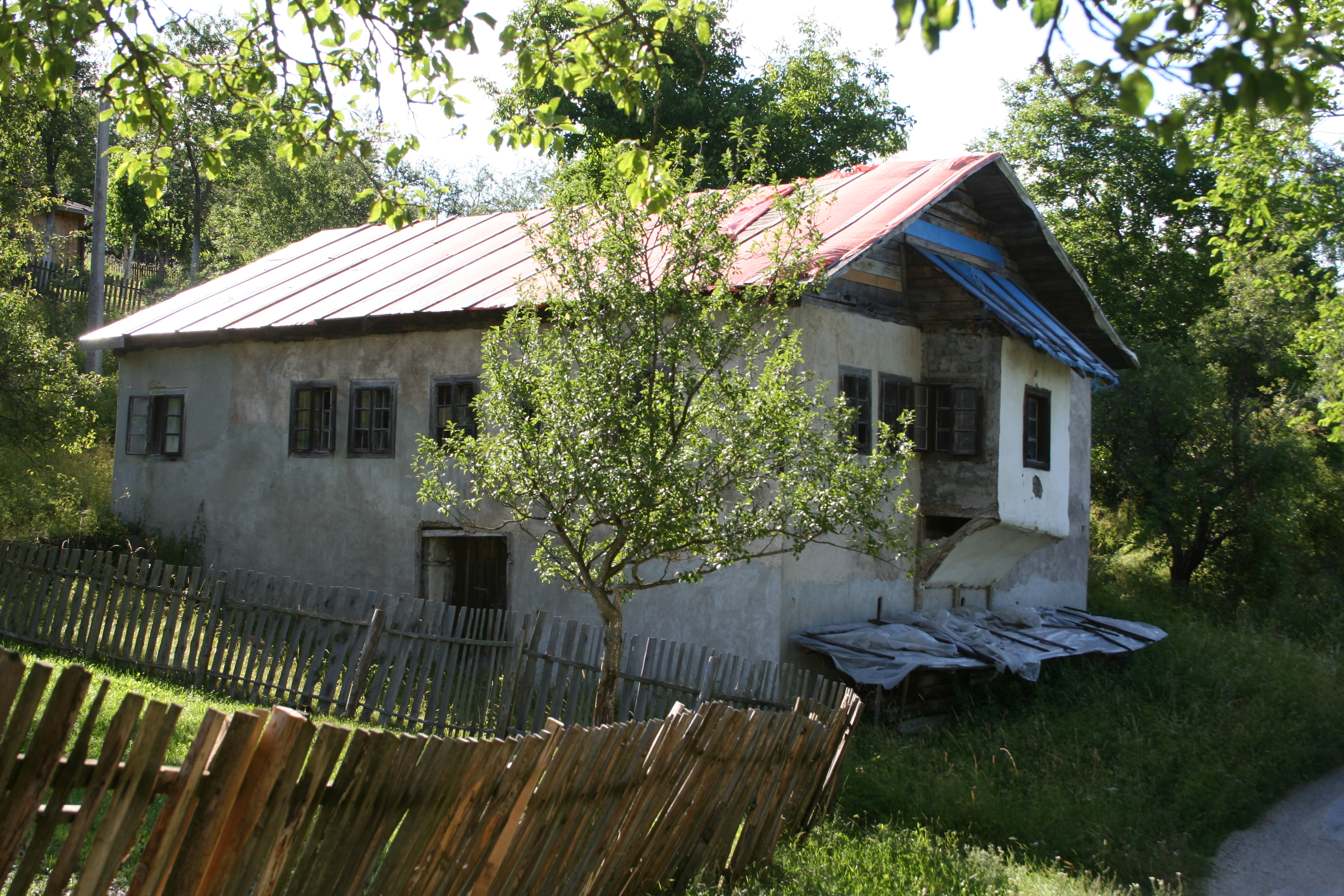

- Location within Serbia
- 43.8389°N 19.5750°E
- Location: Kremna, Užice Municipality, Zlatibor District, Serbia

History
- Built: early 19th century
- Original use: Caravanserai

Cultural Heritage of Serbia
- Official name: Stari Han
- Type: Cultural Monument of Exceptional Importance
- Designated: 28 June 1983
- Reference no.: SK 515

The Stari Han (Serbian Cyrillic: Стари хан) is a former caravanserai in Kremna, Užice municipality, southwestern Serbia. It was listed as a Cultural Monument of Exceptional Importance.

== History ==
The Stari Han was established in the first two decades of the 19th century. It belonged to the Moljković family from Herzegovina. At that time, it was located on the trade route between Užice and Višegrad, one of the two major links between Bosnia and Serbia.

== Architecture ==
The Han was built on a rectangular base on a sloping land. The lower floor hosts a stone warehouse, while the upper floor has several rooms for accommodating the travellers. Opposite the entrance hall, the building has a corbelled prominent part of typical Balkan architecture. The four-sided roof is covered with wood shingles.

== Gallery ==
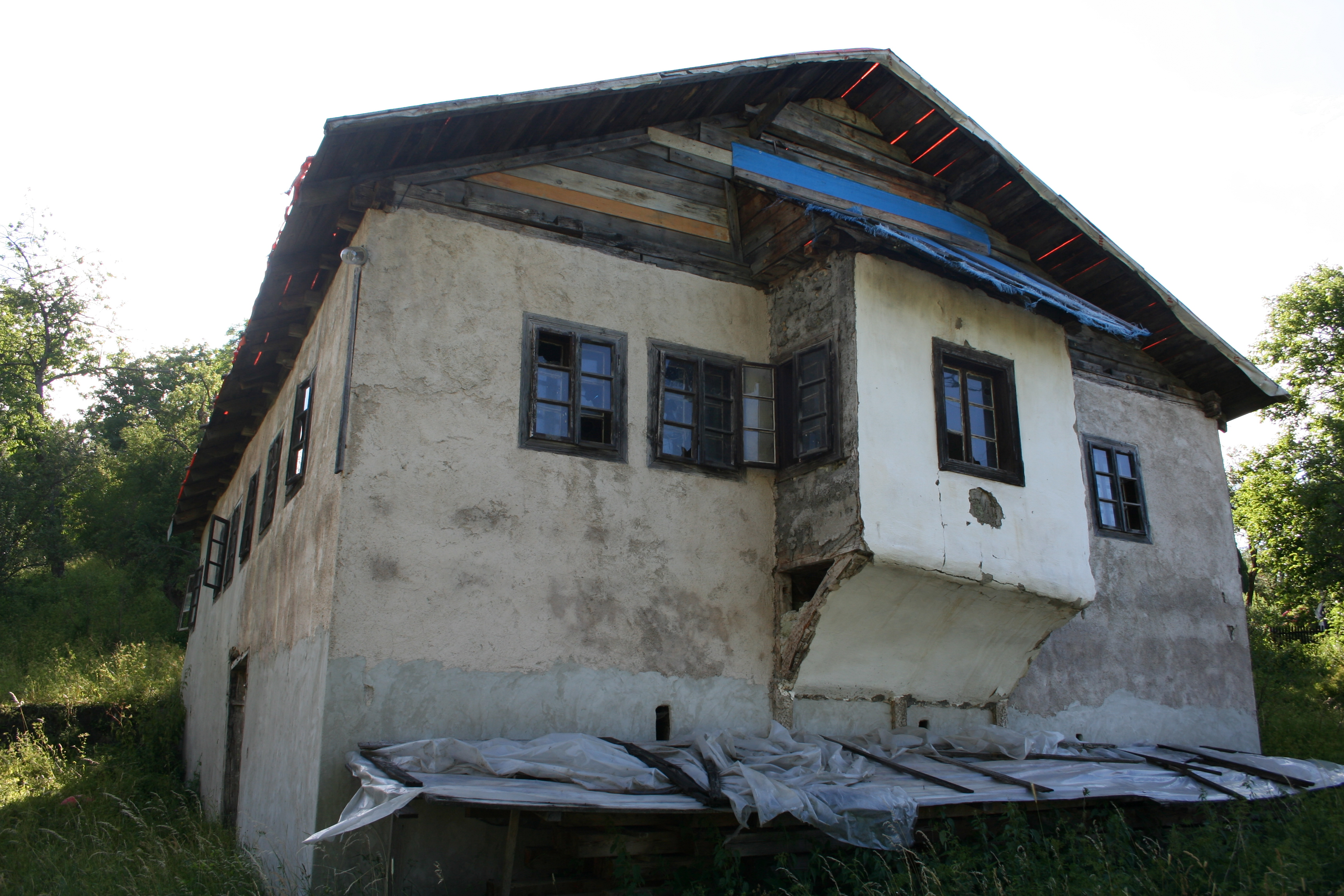

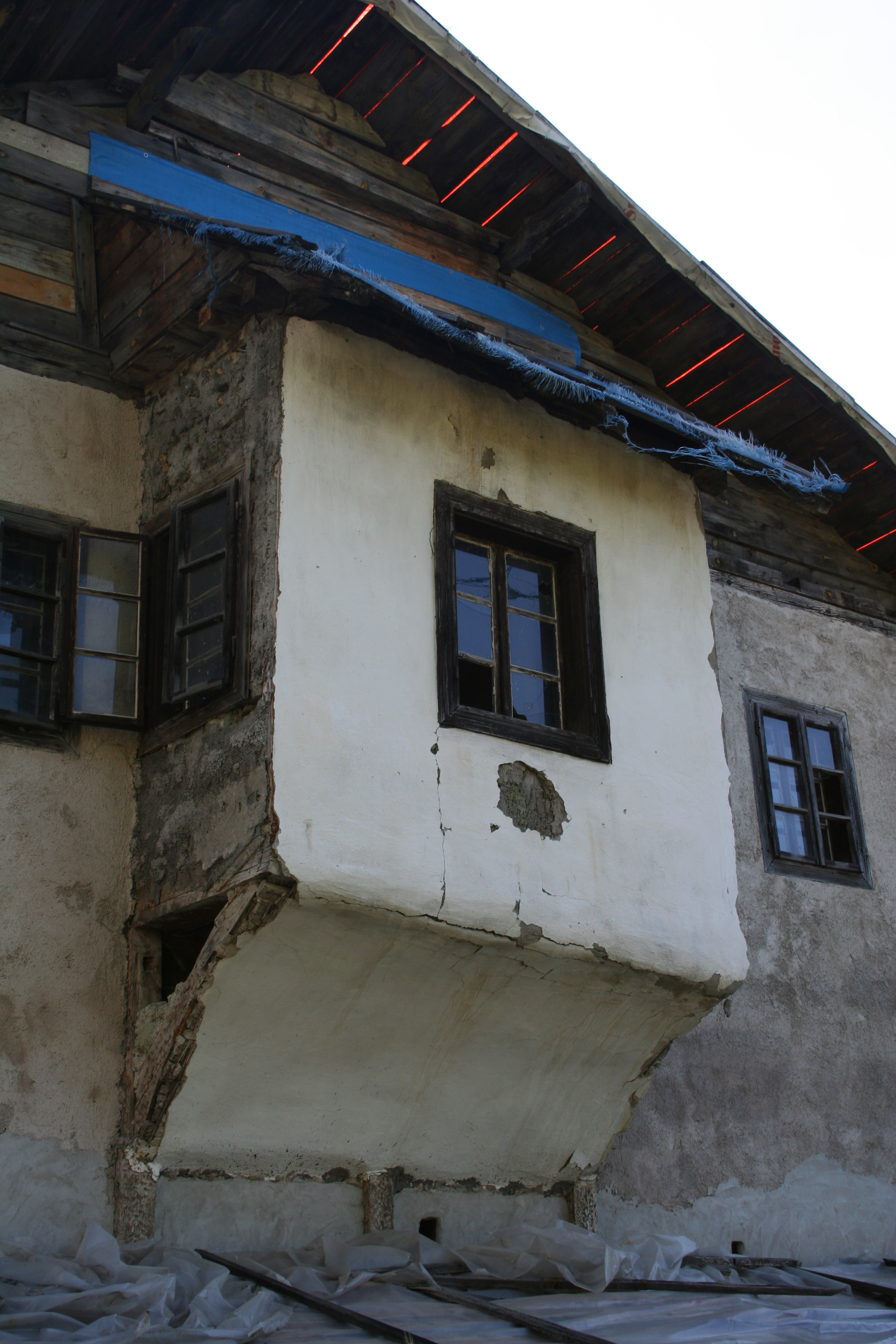

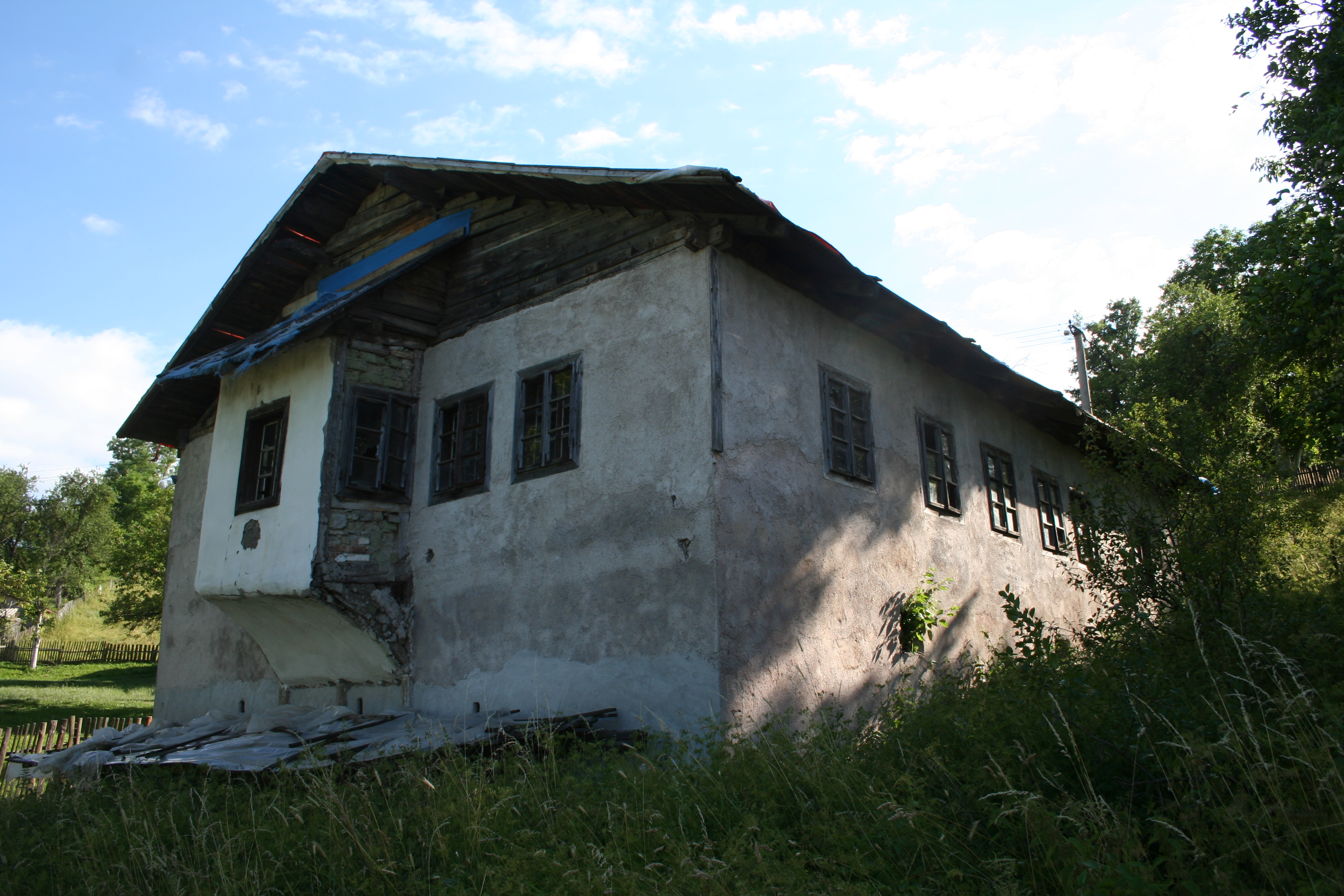

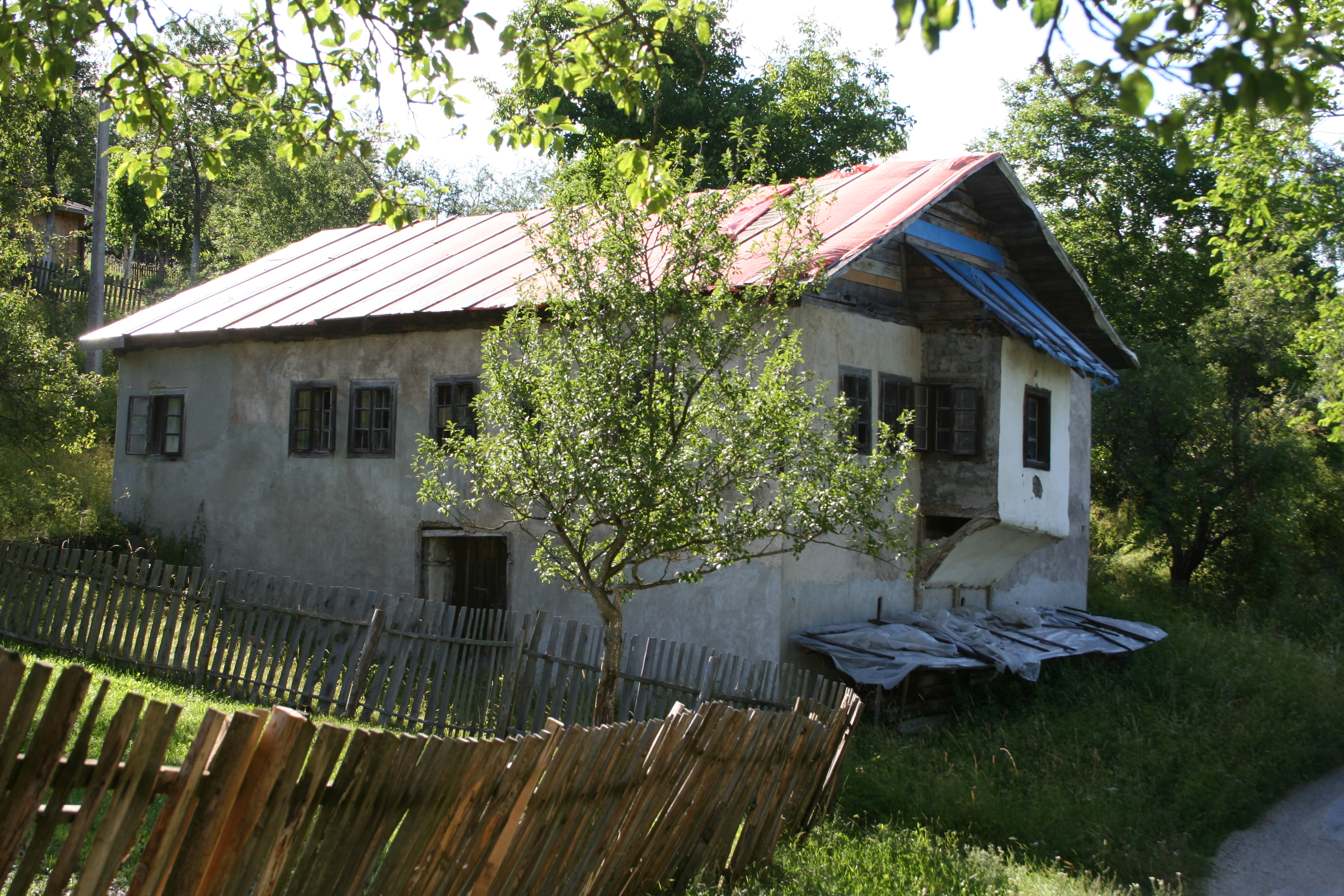

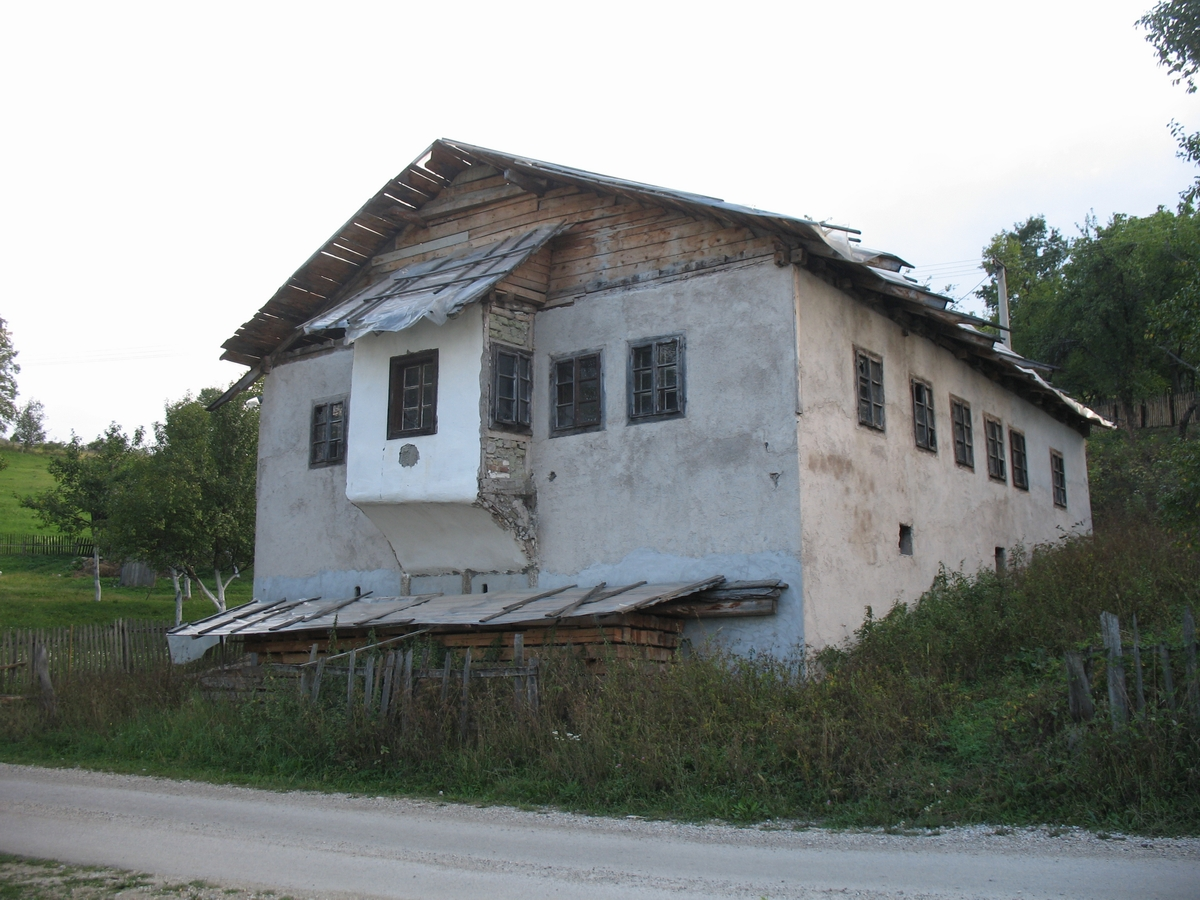
