= Lake Vrutci =

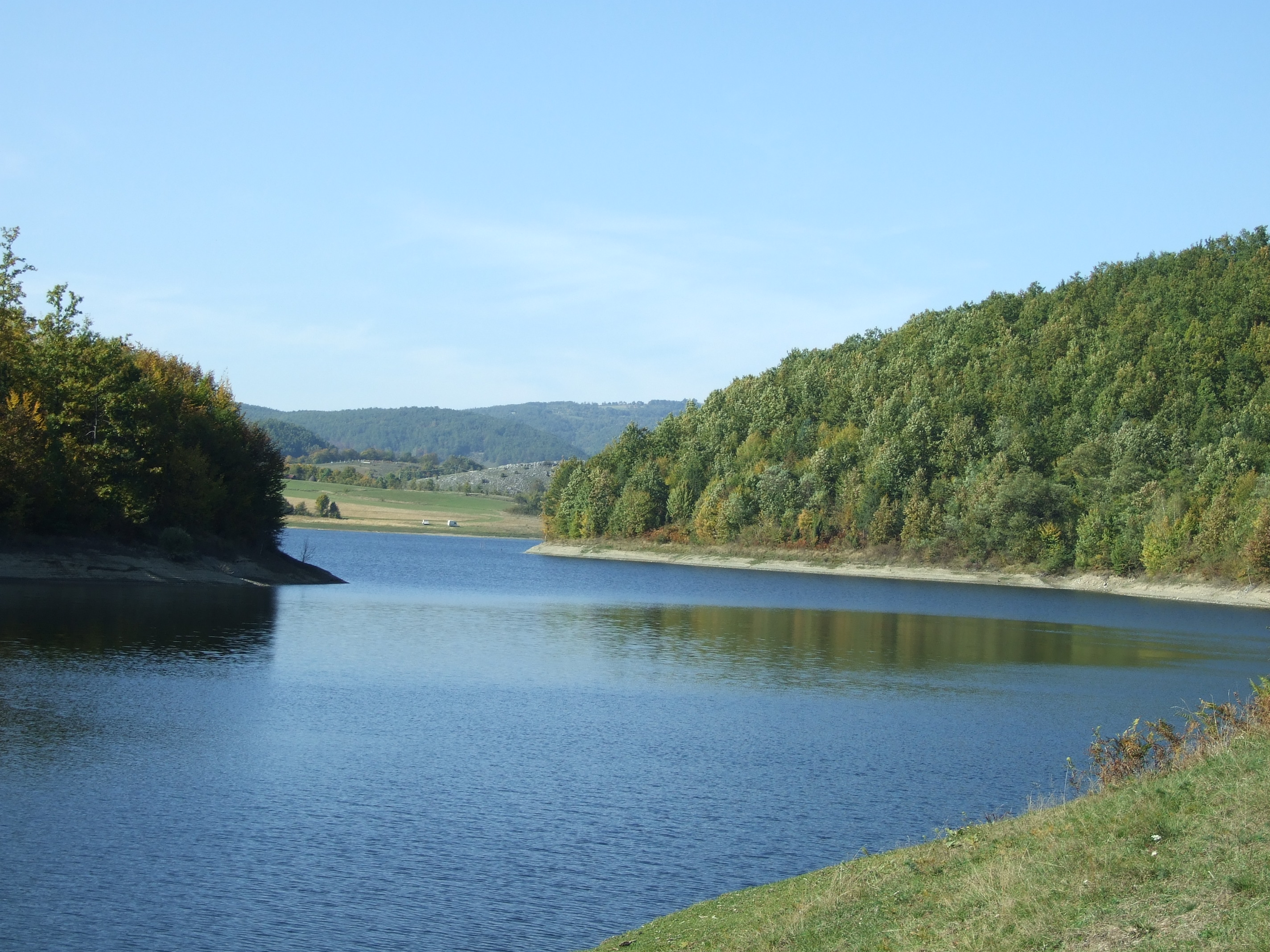
- Lake Vrutci

- Location within Serbia
- Location: Vrutci, Serbia
- Coordinates: 43.849242°N 19.711545°E
- Type: Reservoir
- Basin countries: Serbia
- Settlements: Užice

Lake Vrutci (Serbian: Језеро Врутци, romanized: Jezero Vrutci) is an artificial lake in western Serbia, in the municipality of Užice. The lake was created in 1983 by damming the Đetinja River, near the village of Vrutci. It was created with the purpose of supplying water to the city of Užice. It is narrow, around 7 km long, and lies at an altitude of about 700 m.

In December 2013, a toxic cyanobacterial bloom caused by Planktothrix rubescens was observed in the lake, whose water was immediately banned for human consumption, and soon after for bathing and fishing. The city was left without water supplies for several days, when an emergency link was built to an alternative source, Sušičko vrelo reservoir. A long-term treatment for revival of the lake started, but As of May 2015 the toxic algae were still present in the water. Only in February 2019, after the modernization of the water plant was finished, the water from Vrutci became appropriate for public usage.

== See also ==
- List of lakes in Serbia
