= Kremna =

Kremna Кремна
- Village
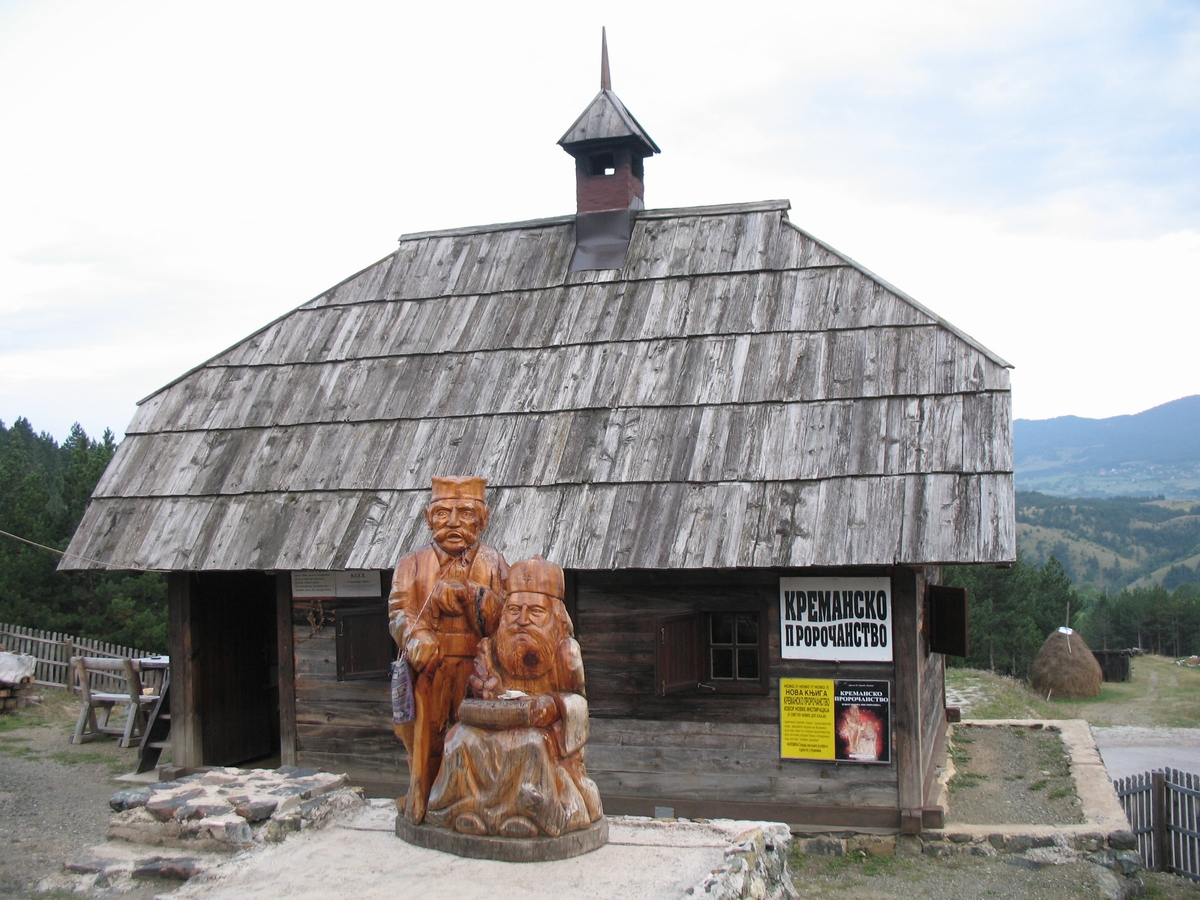
- Part of the memorial complex of clairvoyant Tarabići in Kremna

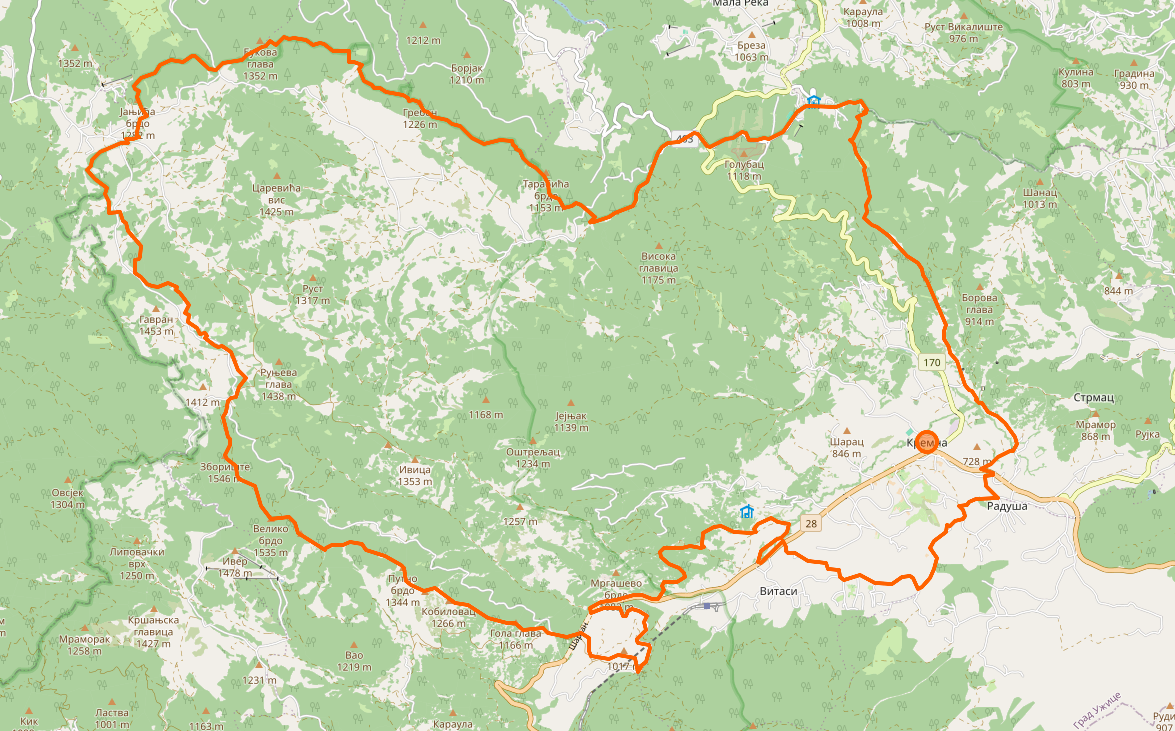

- Location within Serbia
- Coordinates (mountain): 43.8389°N 19.5750°E
- Country: Serbia
- Statistical region: Šumadija and Western Serbia
- District: Zlatibor District
- Municipality: Užice

Area
  - Total: 65.01 km^{2} (25.10 sq mi)
- Elevation: 822 m (2,697 ft)

Population (2022)
  - Total: 452
  - Density: 6.95/km^{2} (18.0/sq mi)
- Time zone: +1
- Postal Code: 31242
- Vehicle registration: UE

Kremna (Serbian Cyrillic: Кремна) is a village located in the city of Užice, southwestern Serbia. As of 2022 census, the village had a population of 452 inhabitants. Kremna is well known for the prophets Miloš Tarabić and his nephew, Mitar Tarabić.

== History ==
Iron Age artifacts including fibulae, graves and cippi found in Kremna show that the village was inhabited between the 7th-4th century BC. Funeral cippi depicting Roman funeral art of the Phrygian God Attis, suggest Kremna was home to a stonemason workshop between the 2nd-4th century AD.

During the Middle Ages, Kremna was purported to have been home to the summerhouse of the Serbian Nemanjić dynasty. In 1738 during the Russo-Turkish War, Serbian Militia units attacked Ottoman forces stationed in the village, setting fire to the local regional caravanserai. During the 19th century, Kremna was populated by Serbs from the regions of Montenegro and Herzegovina.

== Geography ==
The village is approximately 21 km away from Užice and 182 km from Belgrade. It is 822 metres above sea level. Kremna is near Bioska village, Tara Mountain, Zlatibor, and Mokra Gora.

== See also ==
- Prophecy from Kremna
- Stari Han
