= Vrutci, Serbia =

Vrutci Врутци
- Village
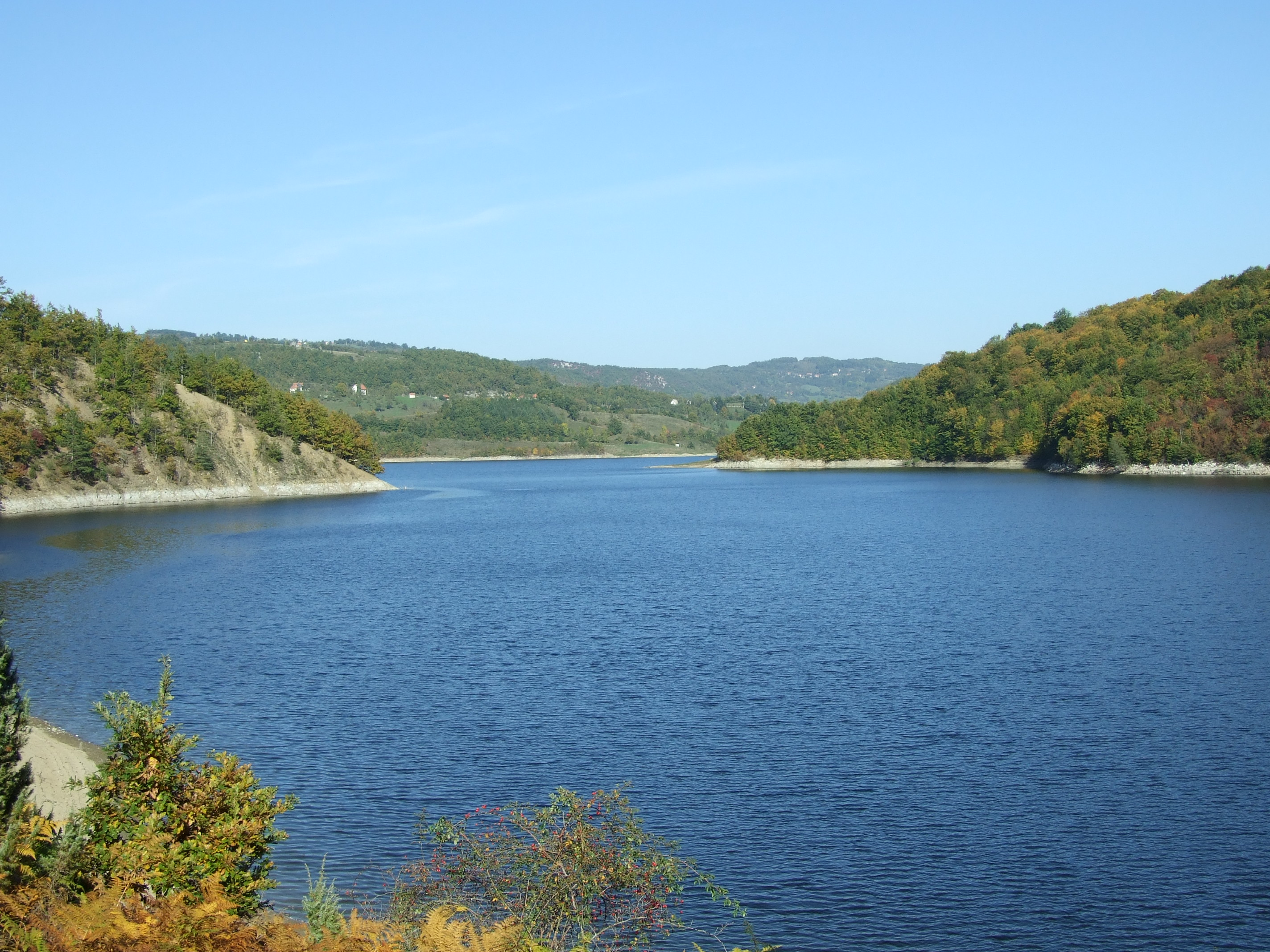
- Lake Vrutci, in close proximity to village

- Location within Serbia
- Coordinates: 43°51′22″N 19°41′58″E
- Country: Serbia
- District: Zlatibor District
- Municipality: Užice

Area
  - Total: 7.99 km^{2} (3.08 sq mi)
- Elevation: 691 m (2,267 ft)

Population (2011)
  - Total: 138
  - Density: 17.3/km^{2} (44.7/sq mi)
- Time zone: UTC+1 (CET)
  - Summer (DST): UTC+2 (CEST)

Vrutci (Serbian Cyrillic: Врутци) is a village located in the city of Užice, southwestern Serbia. As of 2011 census, the village has a population of 138 inhabitants. Much of the settlement was flooded into Lake Vrutci for Užice's water supply.

== Gallery ==
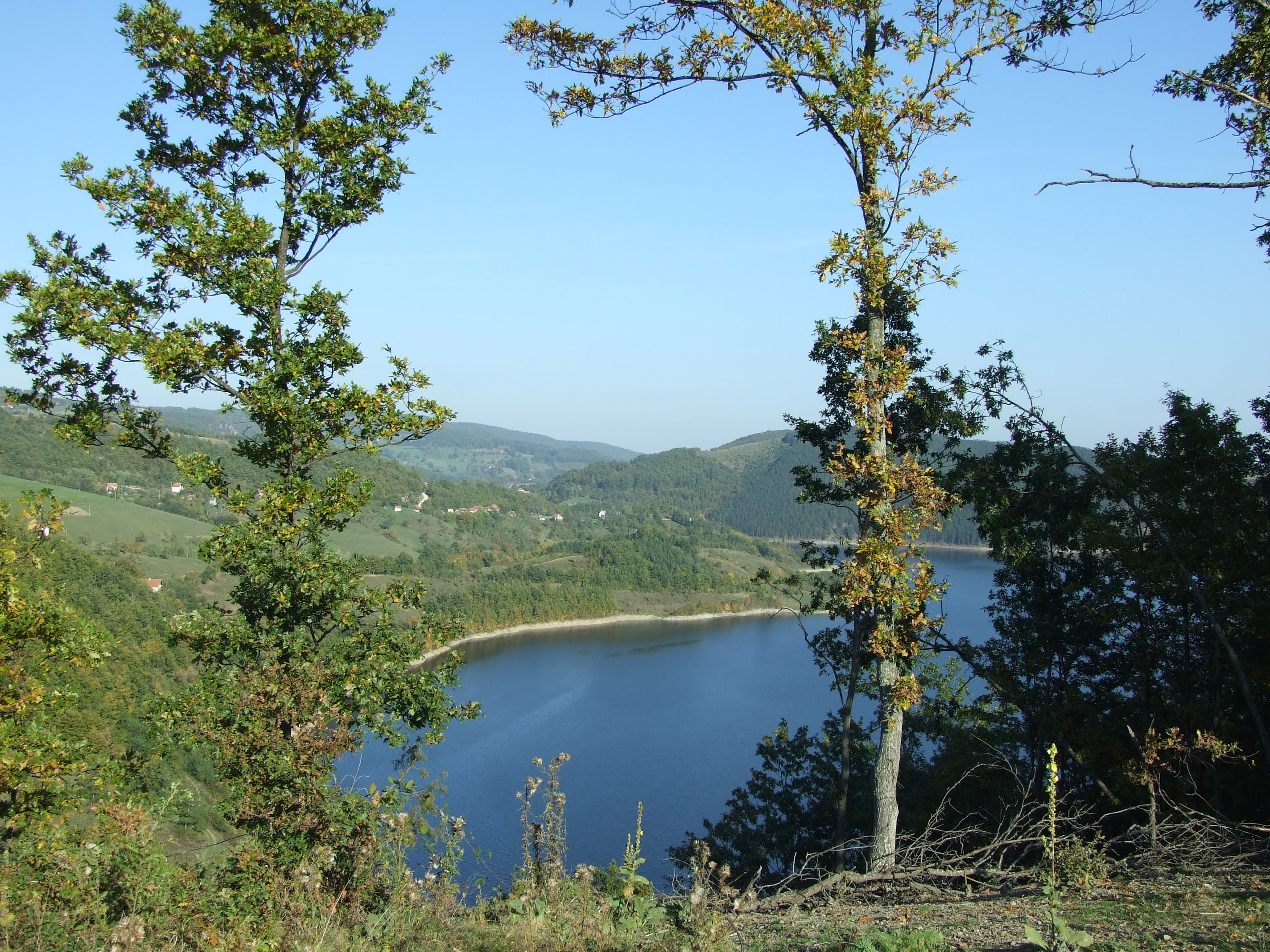
Lake Vrutci seen from top of the hill

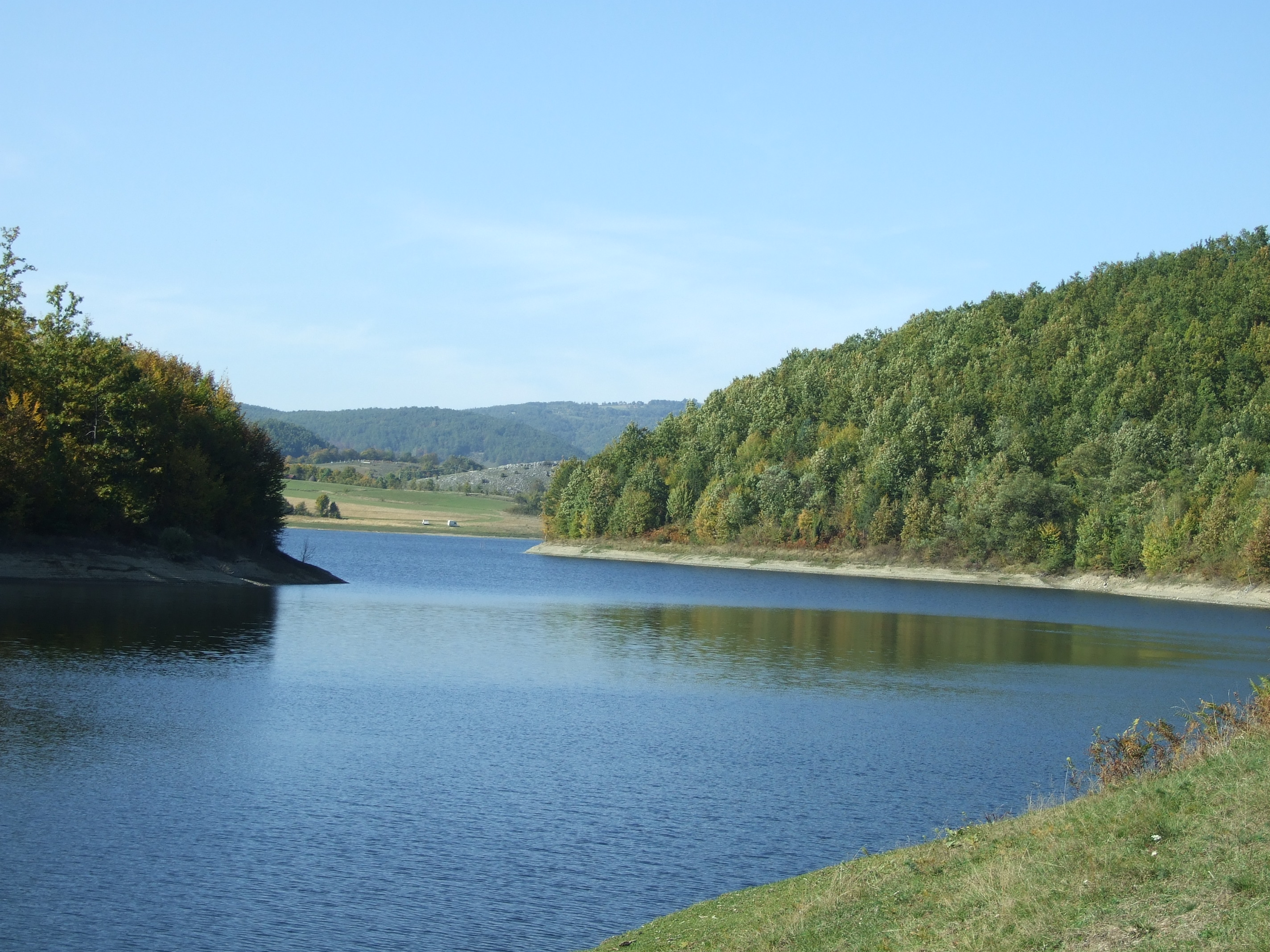
Vrutci Lake

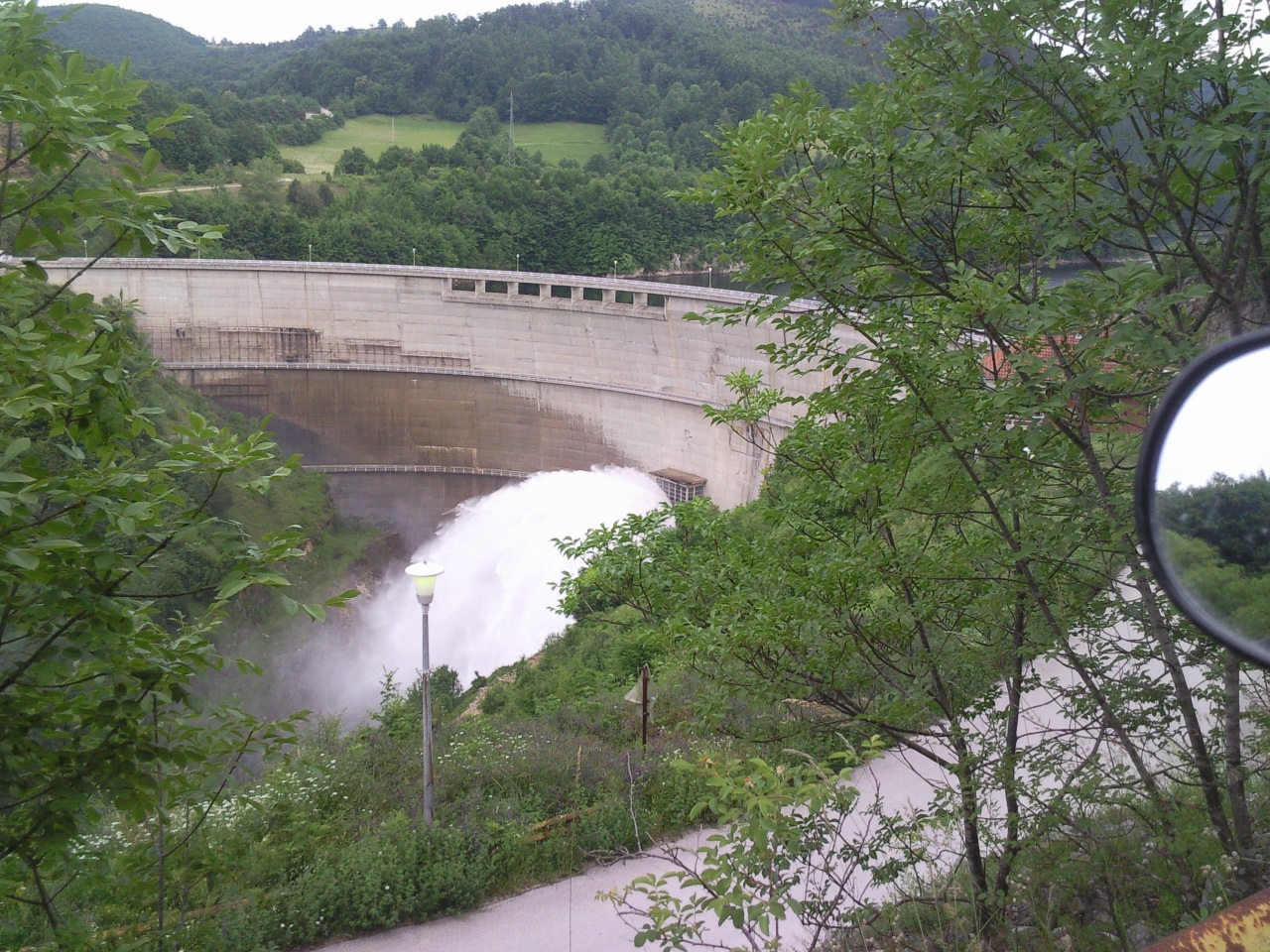
Vrutci Lake Dam

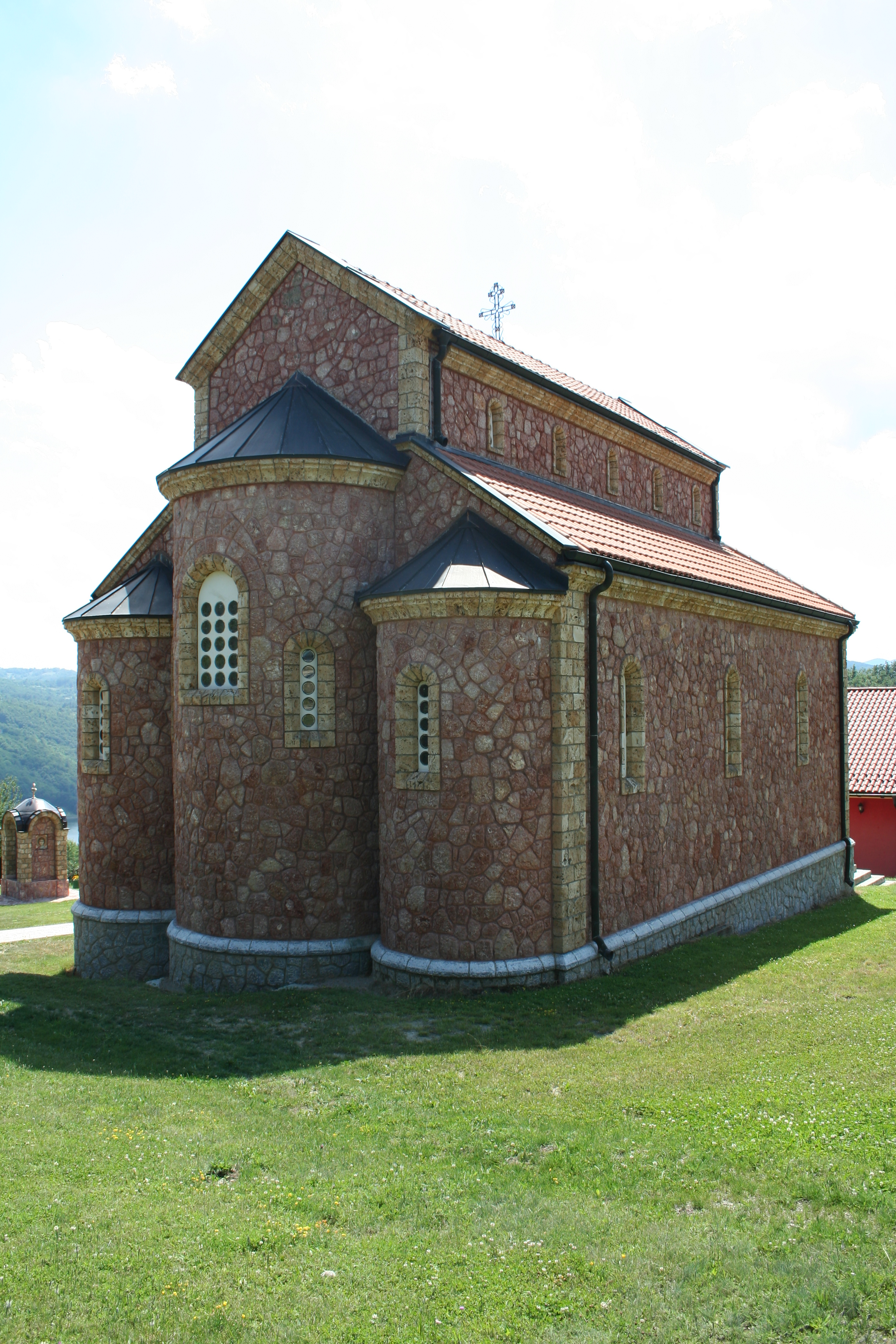
Monastery Rujan [sr]
