= Stapari =

Coordinates: 43°51′51″N 19°44′28″E

- Village
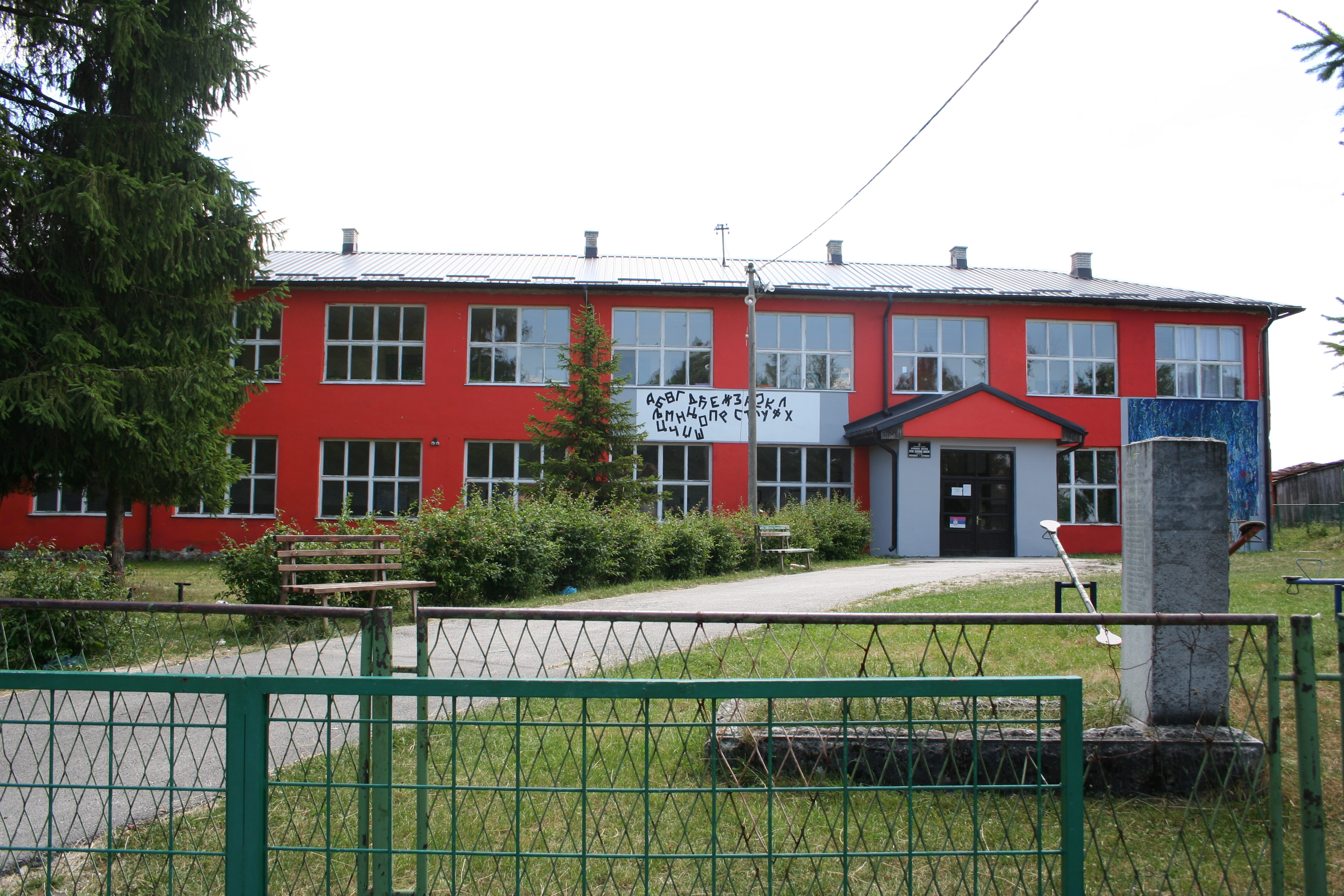
- Building in Stapari
- Interactive map of Stapari
- Country: Serbia

Population (2011)
  - Total: 877
- Time zone: UTC+1 (CET)
  - Summer (DST): UTC+2 (CEST)

Stapari (Serbian Cyrillic: Стапари) is a village located in the Užice municipality of Serbia. According to the 2011 census, the village had a population of 877.

== Demographic history ==
According to the census of 2002, there were 974 people. In 1991, there were 1181 inhabitants.
