= Zlakusa pottery =

- UNESCO Intangible Cultural Heritage
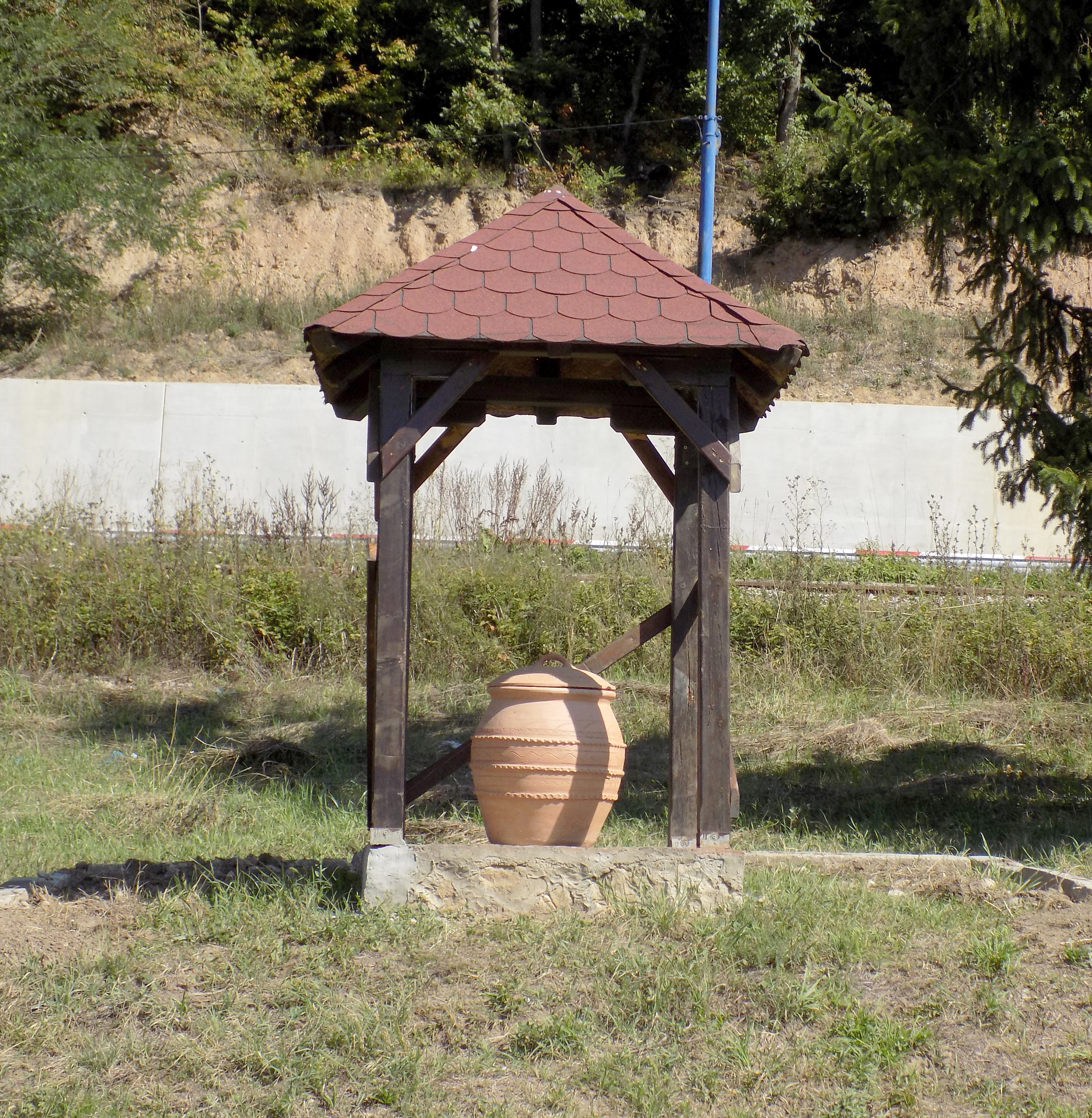
- Pot at the entrance to the village as a symbol of this traditional craft
- Country: Serbia
- Reference: 01466
- Region: Europe and North America

Inscription history
- Inscription: 2020 (15th session)
- List: Intangible Cultural Heritage of Humanity

Zlakusa pottery is a technique of hand-crafting clay dishes on a slow potter's wheel and baked on an open fire, which is not often done in the wider area of the Balkan Peninsula. This tradition, passed down from generation to generation, has been preserved until today by the hardworking residents of the village of Zlakusa, at the foot of the Drežnička Gradina, in the Zlatibor District in Serbia.

The basic material for the production of Zlakusa pots and other pottery is the processed "gnjila" clay, which is mined in the village of Vranjani near Požega at a depth of 2 – 8 meters. Clay is mixed with calcite (which is mined in the neighboring village of Rupeljevo from a mine that is over 200 years old) in a ratio of 1:1 (which enables the production of very large ceramic shapes), then shaped on a potter's wheel and fired over an open fire.

Today, about twenty households in Zlakusa are engaged in pottery making, in which the only update to tradition is the use of a machine for crushing stone.

In 2020, the Zlakusa pottery was included in the national register on the list of intangible cultural heritage of Serbia. The protection area includes the villages: Zlakusa, Rupeljevo, Gorjani, Radovci, Zdravčići and Vranjani.

== Geography of the area where Zlakusa pottery is produced ==
The village of Zlakusa is located at an altitude of 400–931 m above sea level, at the foot and on the slopes of the limestone fortress Drežnik, along the right bank of the Đetinja River, in the Zlatibor District on the territory of the municipality of Užice. It is about 14 km from Užice. It stretches along the highway E761 between Požega and Sevojno. It is bordered by the villages of Gorjani from the north, Uzići from the northeast, Rupeljevo from the east, Roge from the southeast, Drežnik from the south and Potpeće from the west.

The slopes of the surrounding ridges, at an altitude of 450 meters, consist of sandy clay and gravel from quartz and slate.

Rupeljevo is the location from which calcite, a necessary ingredient for making pots, is brought to Zlakusa, and Roge and Potpeće have a significant role in the development of pottery production in the Zlatibor District, although it did not last there. Calcite, which is added to the clay from Vranjani during the preparation of the mass for modeling pots in Zlakusa, is mined in the quarries, on the hill of Vrstine in the vicinity of the village of Rupeljevo. The old quarry, now abandoned, was located in the hamlet of Drndari, on the estate of the Drndarević family. It is mentioned in the literature that in the 1970s, five quarries were known, two of which were active, and that between the two world wars, as many as four quarries were exploited.

Clay for making vessels in Zlakusa is obtained from the village of Vranjani at an altitude of about 400 m, which is located about 18 km from Zlakusa, northwest of Požega on the edge of the Požega basin, which, from a geomorphological point of view, is characterized by Triassic limestones on its southern and southwestern sides rim, while the other sides of that rim are composed of younger Paleozoic slates, Triassic and Cretaceous limestones and serpentinite.
