= BELEX15 =

Serbian stock market index

The BELEX15 index is the blue chip index of the Belgrade Stock Exchange (BELEX).

The index compromises the 15 largest and most liquid stocks traded on the exchange. The index was initially established in September 2005. The newest methodology of calculating it was published in August 2012 and represents a correction in the sense of adjusting this index to characteristics of indexes on developed markets.

== Composition ==
List of the BELEX15 constituents as of 29 March 2024.

Column	Explanation
Company name	Company's name in a simplified form
Symbol	4-letter stock ticker symbol used at the Belgrade Stock Exchange
Headquarters	Location of company's headquarters in Serbia
Market capitalization	Company's market capitalization as of 17 March 2023

Company name	Symbol	Headquarters	Market capitalization
Belgrade Nikola Tesla Airport	AERO	Belgrade	€552.36 million
NIS	NIIS	Novi Sad	€1,078.62 million
Dunav osiguranje	DNOS	Belgrade	€152.40 million
Metalac	MTLC	Gornji Milanovac	€29.13 million
Messer Tehnogas	TGAS	Belgrade	€117.54 million
MPP Jedinstvo	JSEV	Sevojno	€15.98 million
Fintel Energija	FINT	Belgrade	€148.47 million
Impol Seval	IMPL	Sevojno	€40.96 million
Energoprojekt holding	ENHL	Belgrade	€34.10 million

== Index Tracking ==
Passive exposure to the index is possible through an exchange-traded fund - Expat Serbia BELEX15 UCITS ETF - listed in Frankfurt on Xetra (ticker ESNB, ISIN BGSRBBE05183) and traded in euro.
