= BELEXline =

The BELEXline index is the index of the Belgrade Stock Exchange (BELEX). It was introduced in 2007, replacing the Belgrade Stock Exchange Free Market Composite Index (BELEXfm).

BELEXline is free-float market capitalization weighted index, which is not adjusted for paid dividends, and is not protected from dilution effect, which appears as result of dividends payout. BELEXline is weighted only by free-float market capitalization. BELEXline consists of shares traded on the BELEX markets, which have satisfied criteria for inclusion in the index basket. Influence of the components in index is limited to maximum 10% of index capitalization.

== Composition ==
List of the BELEXline constituents as of 30 September 2021.

- Belgrade Nikola Tesla Airport
- Messer Tehnogas
- Komercijalna banka
- NIS
- Metalac
- MPP Jedinstvo
- Fintel Energija
- Dunav osiguranje
- Alta banka a.d.
- Lasta
- Energoprojekt holding
- Impol Seval
- Alfa plam
- Kopaonik
- Iritel a.d.
- Informatika a.d.
- Jugoprevoz Kruševac
- Termika-Beograd a.d.
- Novosadski sajam a.d.
- AMS Osiguranje a.d.
- Tehnohemija a.d.
- Vital
- Preduzeće za puteve Valjevo a.d.
- Goša montaža a.d.
- Min Div a.d.
- Goša FOM a.d. Smederevska Palanka
- Voda Vrnjci a.d.
- Žitopek a.d.
- Putevi Užice a.d.
- Termovent SC Livnica čelika a.d.
- VP Dunav a.d.
- Auto kuća 21. maj a.d.
- Tigar
- Autoventil a.d.
