= Wadi Kaam Dam =

Dam in Zliten, Libya

- Location within Libya
- Country: Libya
- Location: Zliten
- Coordinates: 32°24′34″N 14°20′27″E
- Status: Operational
- Opening date: 1979

Dam and spillways
- Impounds: Wadi Kaam
- Height: 50 m (164 ft)

Reservoir
- Total capacity: 111,000,000 m^{3} (89,989 acre⋅ft)
- Surface area: 13 km^{2} (5 sq mi)

The Wadi Kaam Dam is an embankment dam located on Wadi Kaam, 22 km (14 mi) west of Zliten in Misrata District, Libya. Completed in 1979, the primary purpose of the dam is water supply for irrigation.

The dam was designed and built by Energoprojekt Hidroinženjering, a subsidiary of the Yugoslavian engineering company Energoprojekt, under the supervision of Chief Engineer Stojan J. Čanović.
