= Sevojno =

Sevojno Севојно
- Town and city municipality
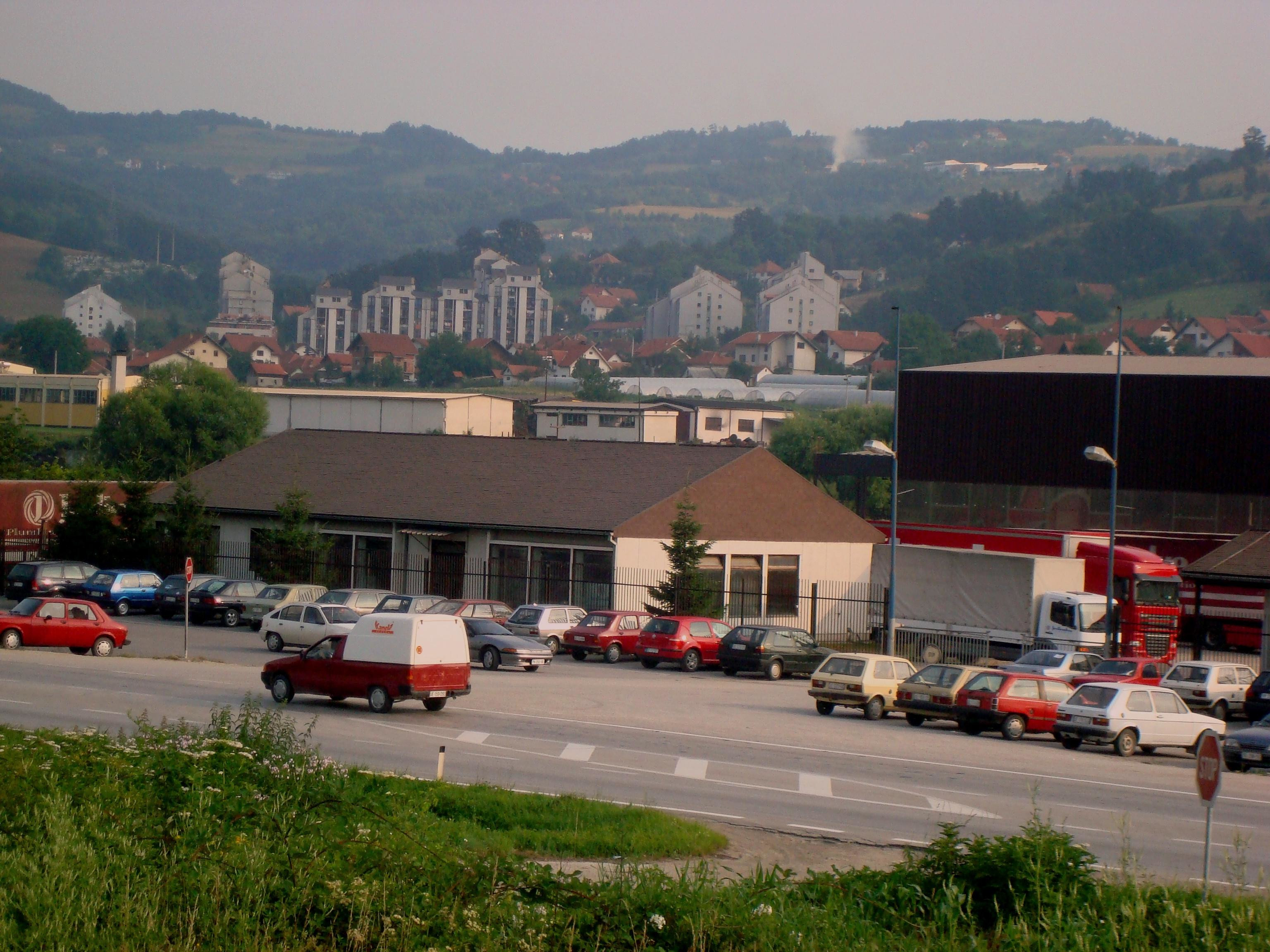

- Location within Serbia
- Coordinates: 43°51′N 19°54′E
- Country: Serbia
- District: Zlatibor
- City: Užice
- Municipality status: 2013

Government
  - Mayor: Mirjana Đurić (SNS)

Area
  - Total: 19.59 km^{2} (7.56 sq mi)

Population (2011)
  - Total: 7,101
  - Density: 362.5/km^{2} (938.8/sq mi)
- Time zone: UTC+1 (CET)
  - Summer (DST): UTC+2 (CET)
- Postal code: 31205
- Area code: +381(0)31
- Car plates: UE
- Website: www.sevojno.org.rs

Sevojno (Serbian Cyrillic: Севојно) is a town in western Serbia, a suburb of Užice. Administratively, it is one of two city municipalities which constitute the City of Užice. As of 2011, the town has 7,101 inhabitants.

== History ==
=== City municipality ===
In February 2012, on a non-binding referendum, the citizens of Sevojno voted for the creation of a separate city municipality within the City of Užice. However, residents of the nearby villages of Zlakusa, Gorjani and Krvavci did not support the initiative. Assembly of the City eventually supported formation of the municipality.

In 2013, the city municipality of Sevojno was established. As of October 2013 the budget negotiations are under way.

== Economy ==
Sevojno is an industrial center of Užice, with aluminum mill Impol Seval, copper mill Valjaonica bakra Sevojno, construction company MPP Jedinstvo and metal recycling facility "Inos-Sinma".

== Sports ==
Sevojno was the home to the former football club FK Sevojno. In 2010, it merged with FK Sloboda Užice.
