= Lagator Stadium =

Football Stadium in Loznica, Serbia

- Стадион Лагатор
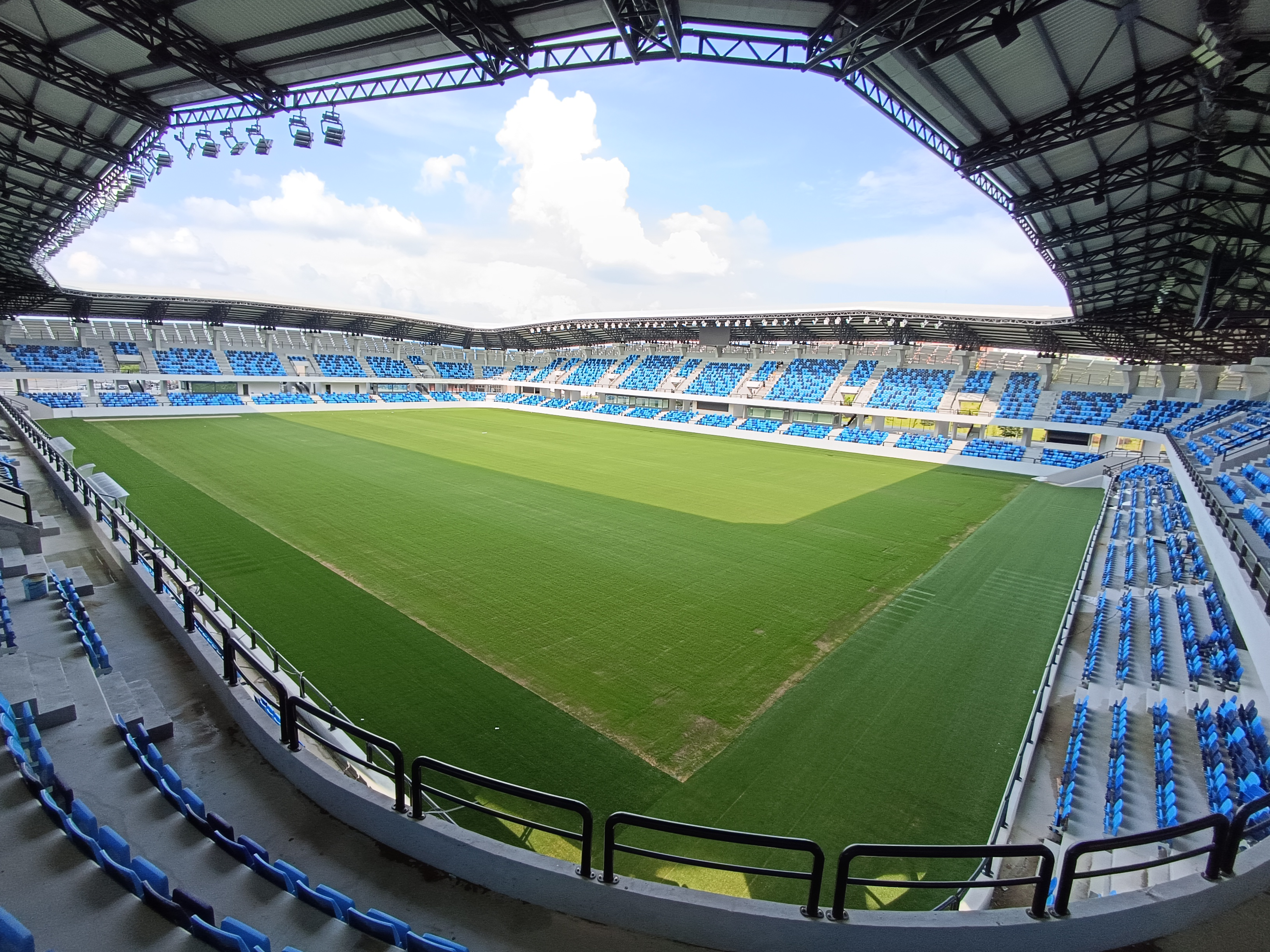
- UEFA
- Interactive map of Lagator Stadium
- Address: Loznica; Serbia
- Coordinates: 44.5392123°N 19.2307421°E
- Owner: City of Loznica
- Operator: FSS Stadiums D.O.O.
- Capacity: 8,030
- Surface: Hybrid grass
- Scoreboard: LED
- Field size: 105 × 68 metres

Construction
- Built: 2021–2023
- Opened: 18 November 2023
- Cost: €30.62 million (2020)
- Project manager: Pro-Ing d.o.o.
- Main contractors: Termomont d.o.o. Teming Electrotechnology d.o.o. MPP Jedinstvo; Geourb d.o.o. Others

Tenants
- Loznica (2023–present); IMT (2024–present): Major sporting events hosted; 2027 UEFA European Under-21 Championship

Lagator Stadium (Serbian: Стадион Лагатор / Stadion Lagator) is a football stadium in Loznica, Serbia. The local club FK Loznica of the Serbian First League plays the home matches on it. The stadium has a total capacity of 8,030 seats.

== Location ==
The stadium is located in "Lagator" urban neighborhood, hence the name. With Lagator Hall (indoor arena) and other sports venues located in close proximity, it comprises the main sports center of Loznica.

== History ==
The original stadium was built following the end of World War II. In 1989, the construction of a new main stand on the west side began. Most of the work was completed the following year, but the grandstand and its equipment were fully finished by 1996. In the period from 1994 to 1997, a new, completely roofed, eastern stand was built. Thanks to the redevelopment, the stadium hosted meetings of national youth teams.

In December 2020, the Government of Serbia accepted the 30.62 million euros bid by Termomont, Teming Electrotechnology, MPP Jedinstvo, Geourb and other companies to build a new stadium. At the beginning of 2021, the old stadium was completely demolished (the last league match took place on 28 November 2020).

The stadium was opened on 18 November 2023 with the Serbian League West match between Loznica and Vrelo Sport that ended with Loznica 3–2 win. Opening match was attended by president of Football Association of Serbia Dragan Džajić and by president of Serbia Aleksandar Vučić.

The stadium was initially designed to be built as a UEFA fourth category venue, yet encountered multiple issues during its construction, leading to an inability to secure any certification straight afterwards its inauguration. By 2024 estimates, the resultant shortcomings are projected to increase the cost by approximately €0.5 million needed for rectification.

== Gallery ==
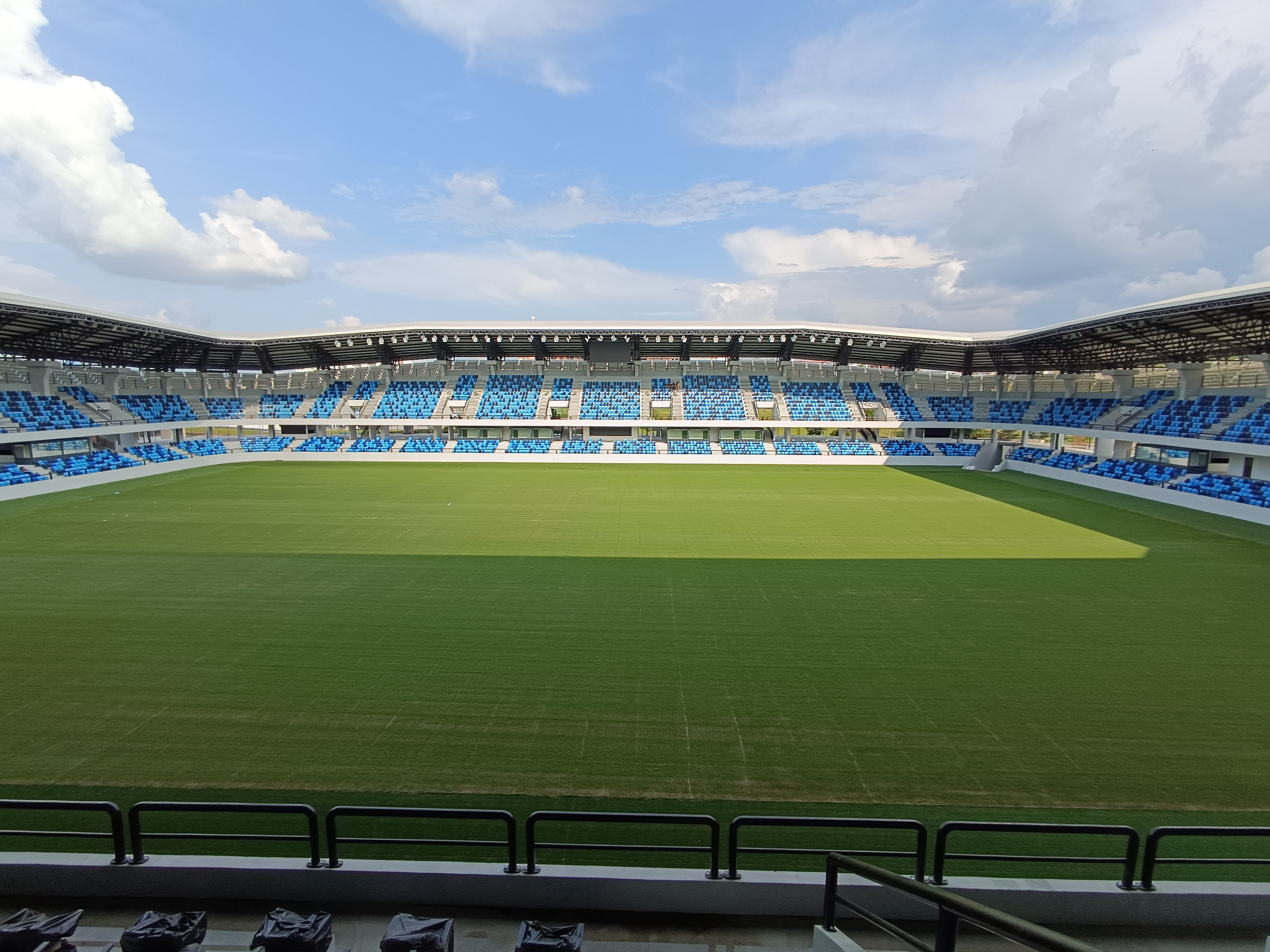
View from the main stand of the stadium

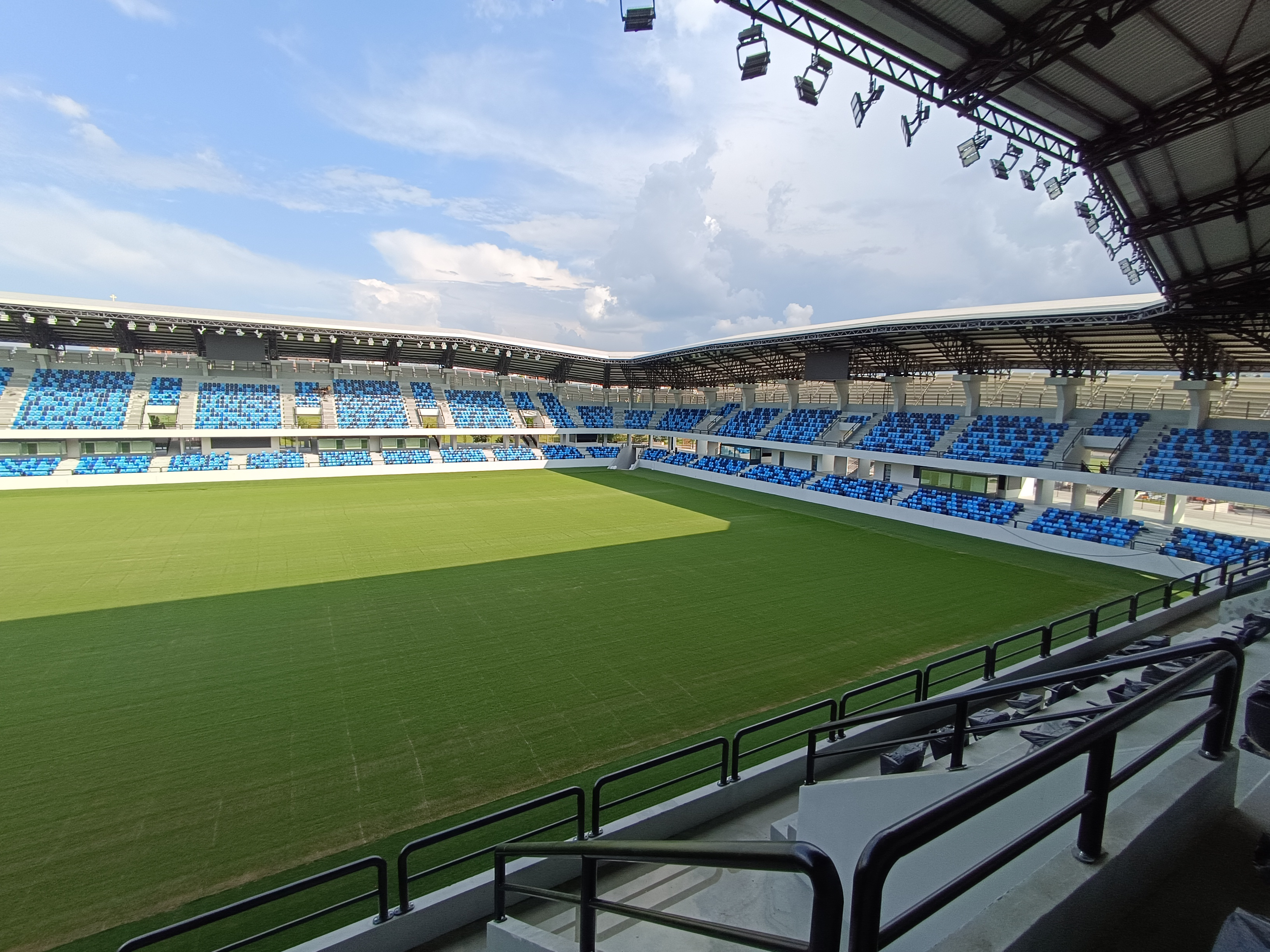
View on the southern stand from the main stand of stadium

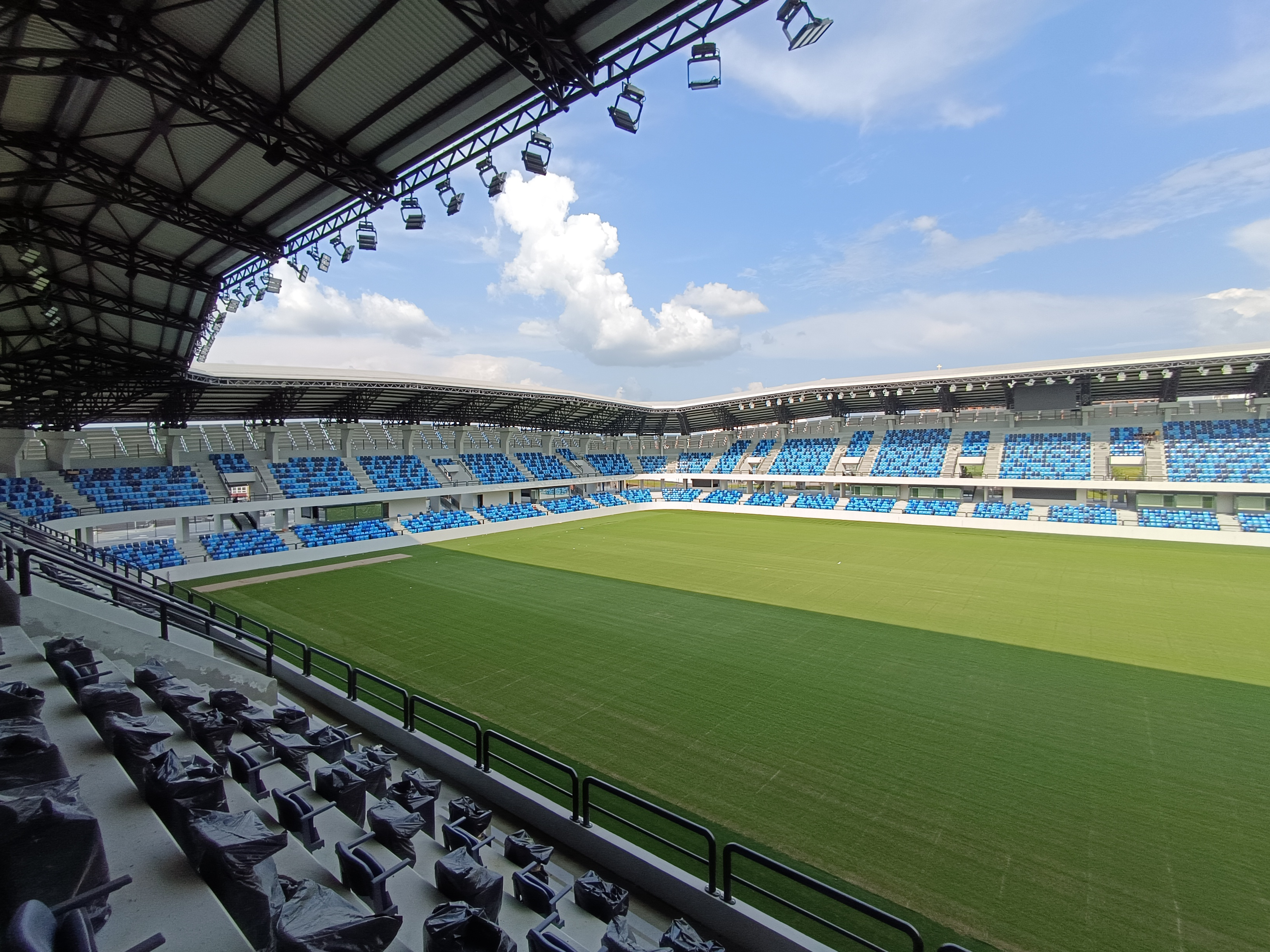
View on the northern stand from the main stand of stadium

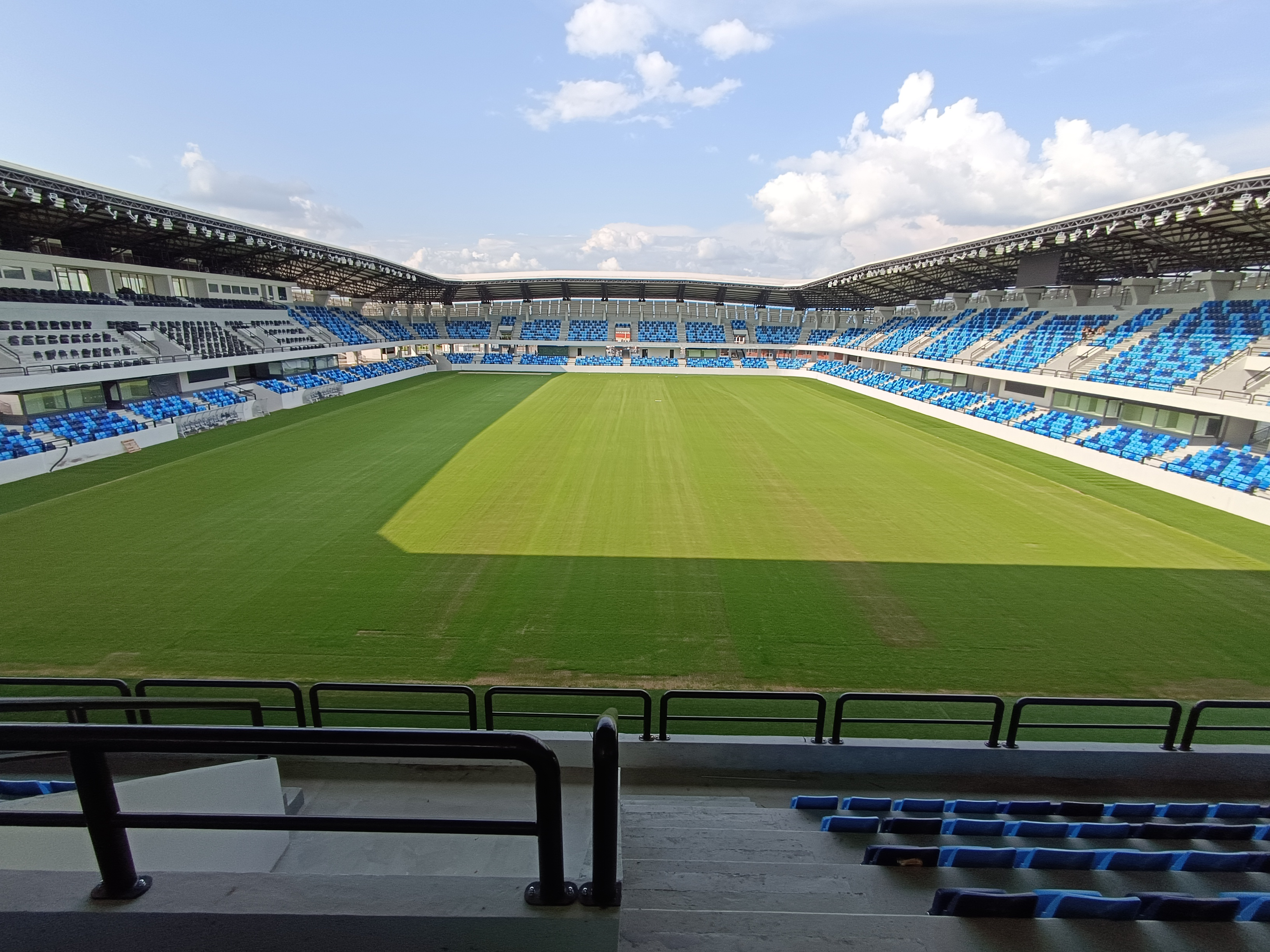
View on northern stand from southern stand of the stadium

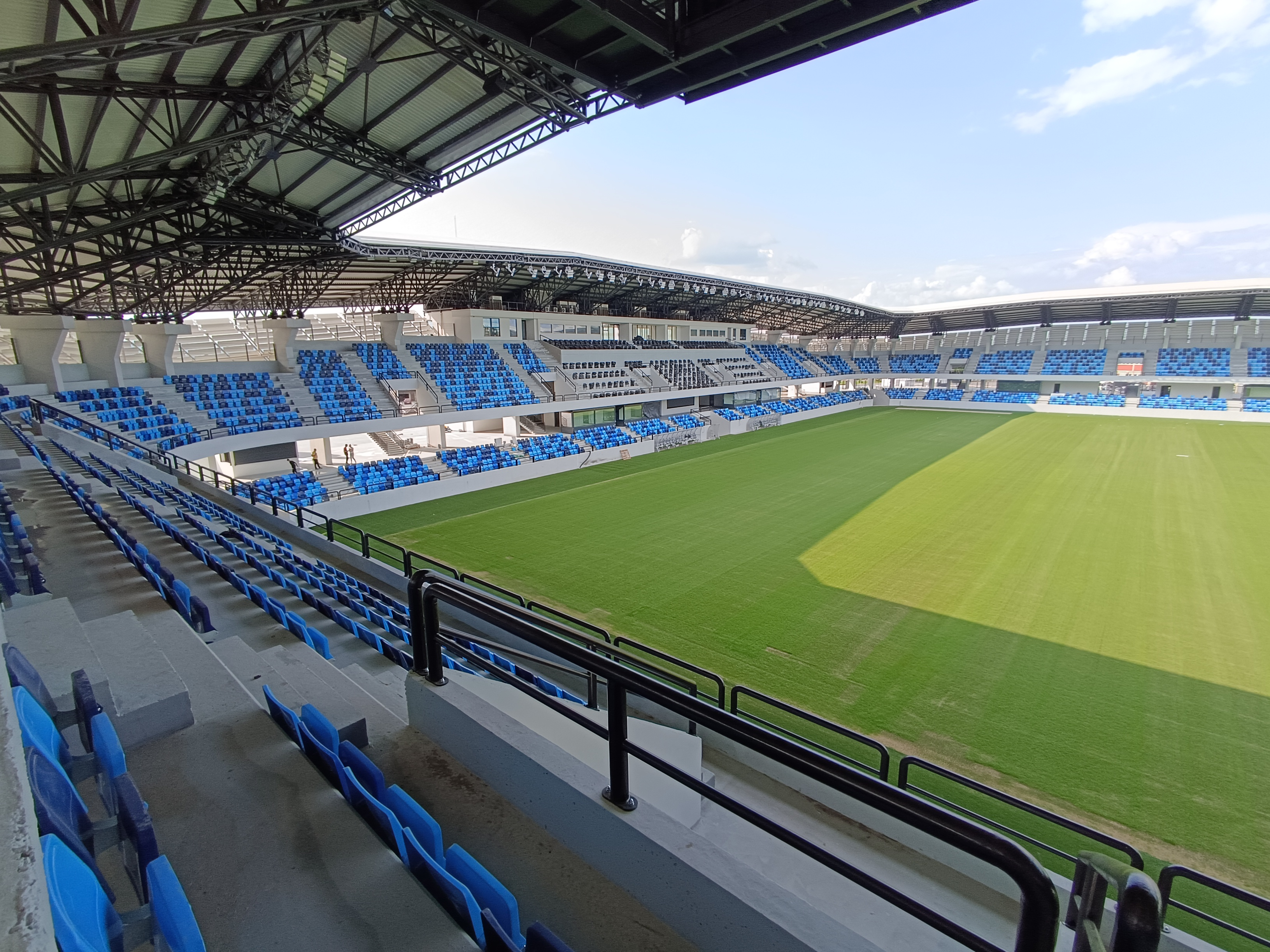
View on main stand of the stadium

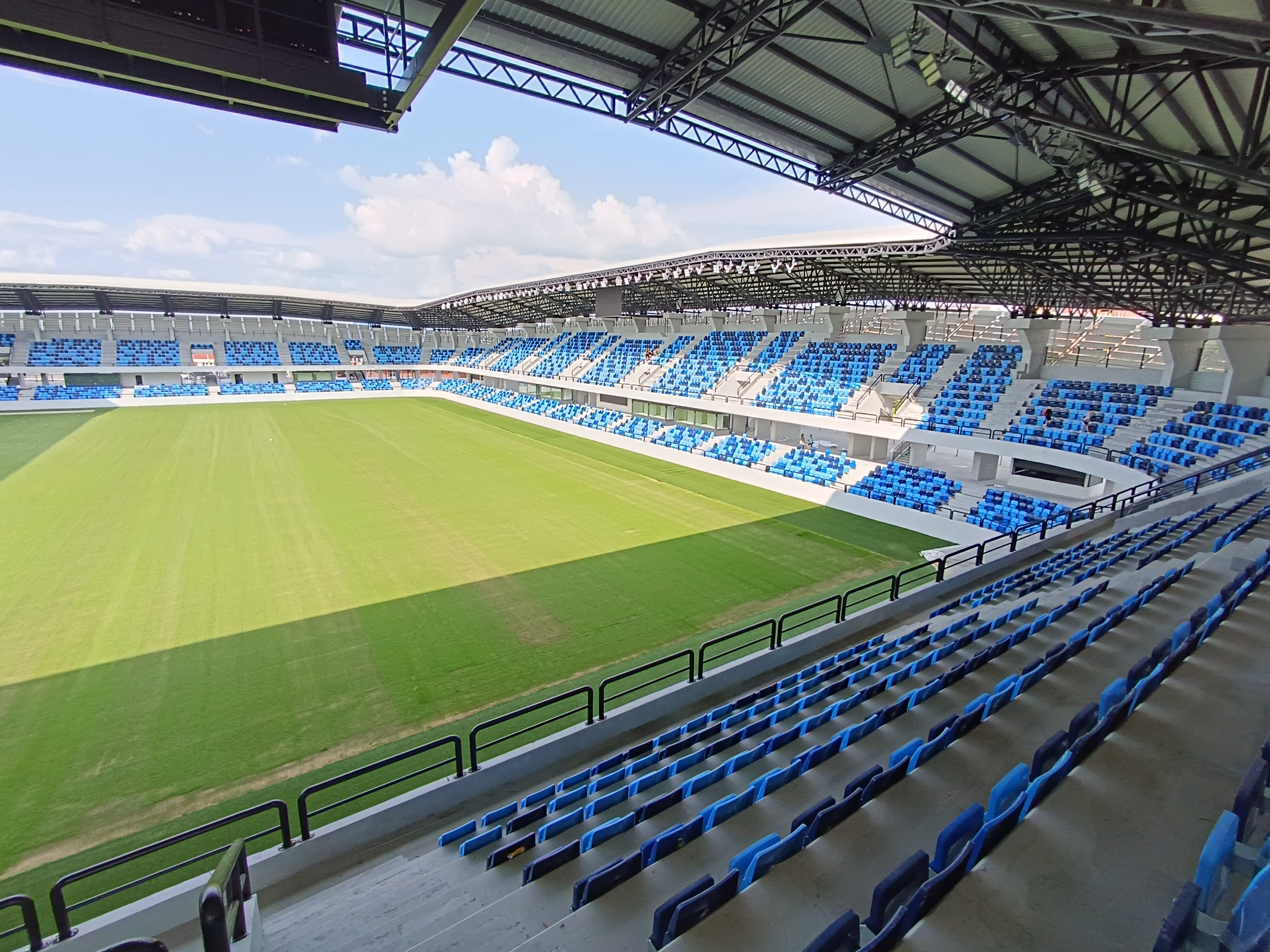
View on eastern stand of the stadium

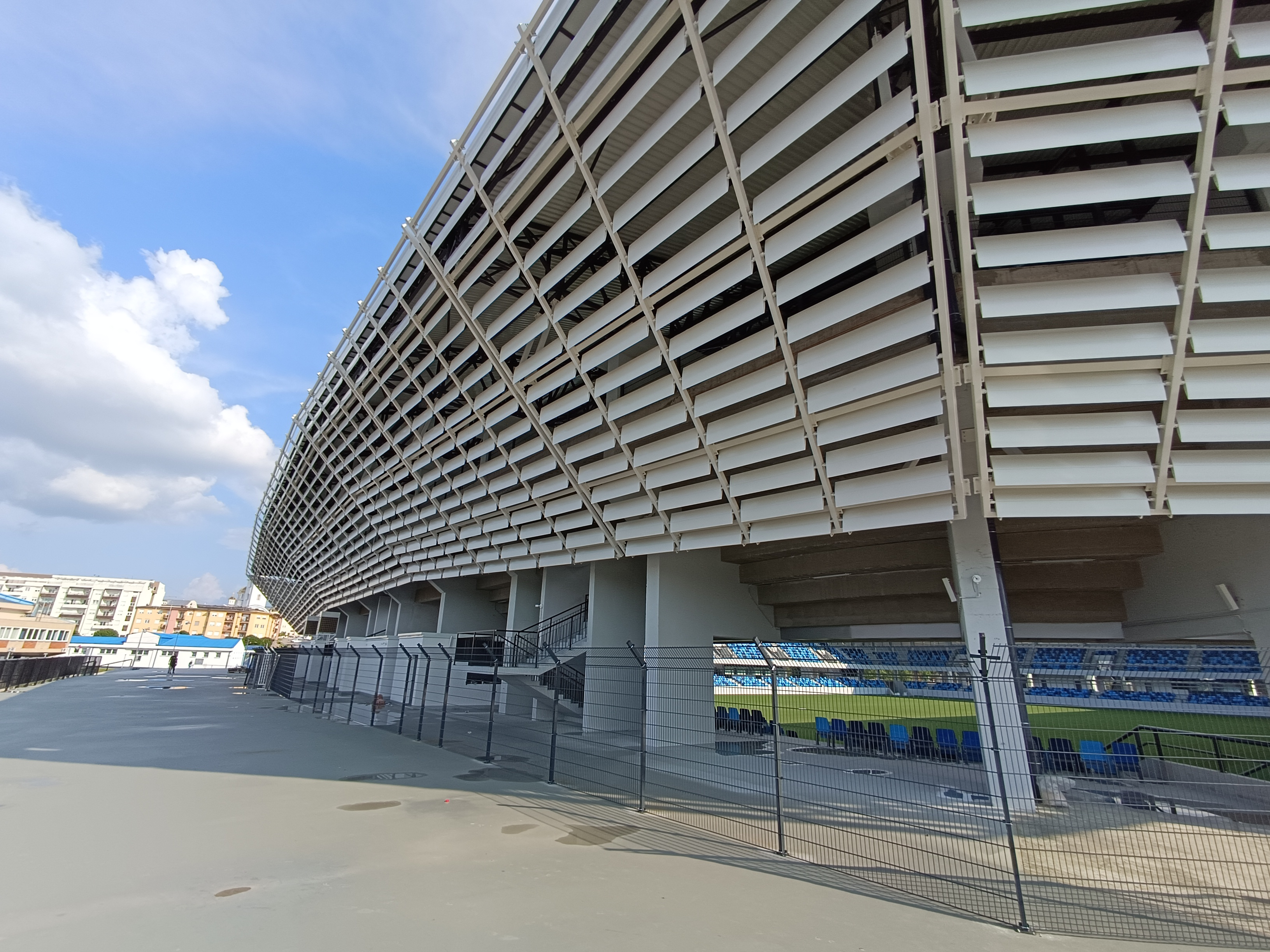
View on the Lagator Stadium from the outside

== See also ==
- List of football stadiums in Serbia
