= Valjaonica bakra Sevojno =

Serbian copper manufacturing company

Coordinates: 43°50′34.9″N 19°53′27.2″E

- Official logo
- Native name: Ваљаоница бакра Севојно
- Company type: Joint-stock company
- Traded as: BELEX: VBSE
- Industry: Metals
- Founded: 19 June 1950; 75 years ago
- Headquarters: Prvomajska bb, Sevojno, Užice, Serbia
- Area served: Worldwide
- Key people: Milija Božović (General director); Vasa Žigić (Executive director); Nataša Pančić (Executive director); Đorđe Gucić (Executive director); Stanimir Stanković (Executive director)
- Products: Copper
- Production output: 22,600 tonnes of copper (2017)
- Revenue: ▲€142.78 million (2018)
- Net income: ▼€3.47 million (2018)
- Total assets: ▲€58.29 million (2017)
- Total equity: ▲€14.64 million (2018)
- Owner: East Point Metals Ltd. (80.87%); Akcionarski Fond (9.72%); Other minority shareholders
- Number of employees: 1,066 (2018)
- Subsidiaries: Valjaonica Bezbednost d.o.o. VBS Handel GmbH Germany
- Website: www.vbs.co.rs
- Footnotes / references Business ID: 07606273; Tax ID: 101624563

Valjaonica bakra Sevojno (Serbian: Ваљаоница бакра Севојно) or Copper Mill Sevojno, is a Serbian copper manufacturing company headquartered in Sevojno, Užice, Serbia.

== History ==
From 1950 to 1989, the company operated as part of "SOUR Valjaonica Sevojno". The production started in 1952. "SOUR Valjaonica Sevojno" was the largest copper manufacturer in the former Yugoslavia, while the aluminum production was secondary activity of the company. In 1990, it was reorganized and operated as "Valjaonica bakra i aluminijuma" Sevojno.

In 1991, the aluminum mill Valjaonica Aluminijuma Sevojno was split from the company and operated since 17 January 1991 as an independent business enterprise. As of 2003, the company had around 2,000 employees.

In November 2003, the Government of Serbia sold 70% of shares of the company to East Point Metals Ltd. company (Cyprus), owned by Serbian businessman Zoran Drakulić. The total sum of transaction was 27 million euros, of which 17 million came as an obligation to invest in production facilities.

In 2011, "RC2" and "Darby" investment funds bought the East Point Metals Ltd. from Zoran Drakulić. In March 2012, there were reports that the Serbian "Farmakom MB" owned by Serbian businessman Miroslav Bogićević, is in the process of purchase of 80.8% of shares in the company. However, the transaction was never realized.

In 2017, according to the general director Božović, Valjaonica bakra Sevojno has produced 22,600 tonnes of copper, of which 95% is exported. Large quantities of processed copper in Valjaonica bakra Sevojno, is being delivered from the domestic copper mining and smelting complex RTB Bor.

== Market and financial data ==
As of 8 March 2019, Valjaonica bakra Sevojno has a market capitalization of 6.54 million euros.

== Accidents ==
On 10 November 2017, one employee was injured when he was hit by the forklift in the production facility, causing him serious leg injuries. On 19 January 2018, one employee was seriously injured (skin burns all over the body) caused by spraying of the liquor.

== See also ==
- Impol Seval
- RTB Bor
