= Energoprojekt holding =

Serbian engineering company

- Native name: Енергопројект холдинг
- Type: Joint-stock company
- Traded as: BELEX: ENHL
- Industry: Construction
- Founded: 6 September 1998; 28 years ago (Current form); 1951; 75 years ago (Founded)
- Headquarters: Bulevar Mihajla Pupina 12, Belgrade, Serbia
- Area served: Worldwide
- Key people: Stojan Čolakov (CEO)
- Revenue: ▼€130.32 million (2022)
- Net income: ▼€0.12 million (2022)
- Total assets: ▼€314.44 million (2022)
- Total equity: ▲€165.40 million (2022)
- Owner: Napred razvoj a.d. Novi Beograd (41.17%); Government of Serbia (33.58%); Montinvest Properties (5.17%); Jopag AG (5.13%); Others
- Number of employees: 1,043 (2022)
- Subsidiaries: Energoprojekt Hidroinženjering; Energoprojekt Urbanizam i arhitektura; Energoprojekt Entel; Energoprojekt Industrija; Energoprojekt Visokogradnja; Energoprojekt Niskogradnja; Energoprojekt Oprema; Energoprojekt Energodata
- Website: www.energoprojekt.rs
- Footnotes; Business ID: 07023014; Tax ID: 100001513

Energoprojekt holding (full legal name: Energoprojekt holding a.d. Beograd) is a Serbian construction company with headquarters in Belgrade, Serbia. Founded in 1951, it enters into the composition of BELEX15 and BELEXline, the two main indices of the Belgrade Stock Exchange.

== History ==
The Energoprojekt holding was founded on 11 July 1951 under the supervision of the Yugoslav authorities. It developed major infrastructural projects in countries of the Non-Aligned Movement.

While originally conceived as a consulting company, it has gradually diversified its activities, and today it has numerous subsidiaries and joint ventures in Serbia and abroad. Energoprojekt was admitted to the regulated market of the Belgrade Stock Exchange 18 July 2007.

In July 2017, after months of negotiations, Napred Razvoj, a Serbian construction company, became the majority stakeholder of the company. In November 2017, a new majority shareholder, Napred Razvoj, decided to sell insurance subsidiary Energoprojekt Garant to the Slovenian insurance company Sava Osiguranje.

== Activities ==
Energoprojekt holding is a worldwide company based in Serbia and develops activities in the fields of energy, industry, architecture, infrastructure, environment and information technologies, it operates through its subsidiaries Energoprojekt Hidroinženjering (engineering, hydropower, water supply systems and irrigation), Energoprojekt Urbanizam i arhitektura (building, engineering and construction), Energoprojekt Entel (engineering, energy, power plants, transmission and distribution of electricity), Energoprojekt Industrija (engineering, industrial plants and facilities), Energoprojekt Visokogradnja (building, engineering and construction, civil engineering, industrial and energy installations), Energoprojekt Niskogradnja (construction, various facilities in infrastructure), Energoprojekt Oprema (constructions in the areas of energy, of water management and industry), Energoprojekt Energodata (Information Technology) and Energoprojekt Garant (insurance).

== Locations and operational activities ==
Aside from Serbia, Energoprojekt Holding is represented in:

- South America, in Peru
- Africa, directly or through subsidiaries in Algeria, Guinea, Ghana, Nigeria, Uganda, Zambia and Zimbabwe
- Middle East, in Jordan, Iraq, Qatar, Abu Dhabi, Dubai and the Sultanate of Oman
- Asia, in Kazakhstan
- Europe, in the United Kingdom, Germany, Montenegro, Cyprus and Russia.

== Achievements ==
Among the projects undertaken by Energoprojekt Holding include the plant Iron Gate I Hydroelectric Power Station, near Kladovo (designed jointly with the Institute of Hydroelectrical Researches in Bucharest, Romania, between 1956 and 1960), and the dam and power plant Bajina Bašta. The company has also built power plants in Obrenovac and Obilić, while outside of Serbia it has constructed two power plants in Qatar. In Belgrade, in the field of architecture, it has built the Belgrade Arena, the Hotel Hyatt Regency Belgrade, a mansion for Robert Mugabe in Harare and others.

=== Hydropower plants in Serbia ===
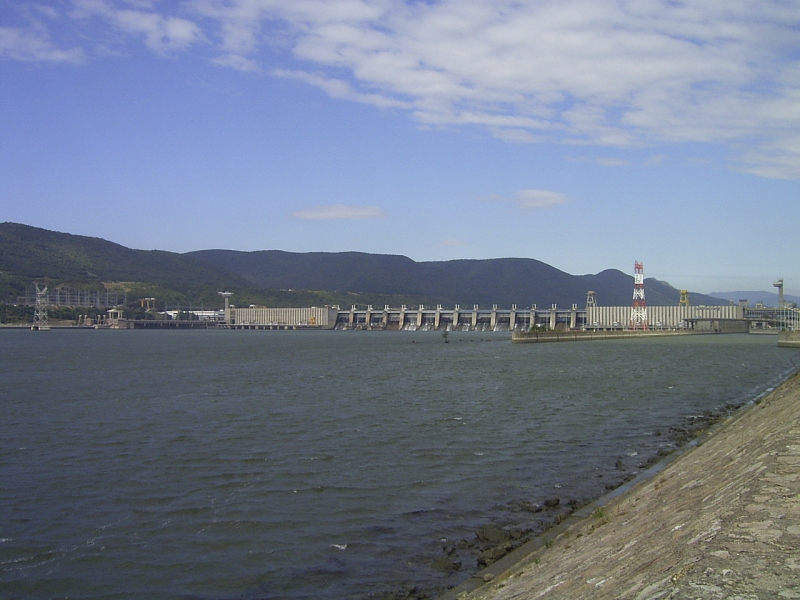
Iron Gate I Hydroelectric Power Station

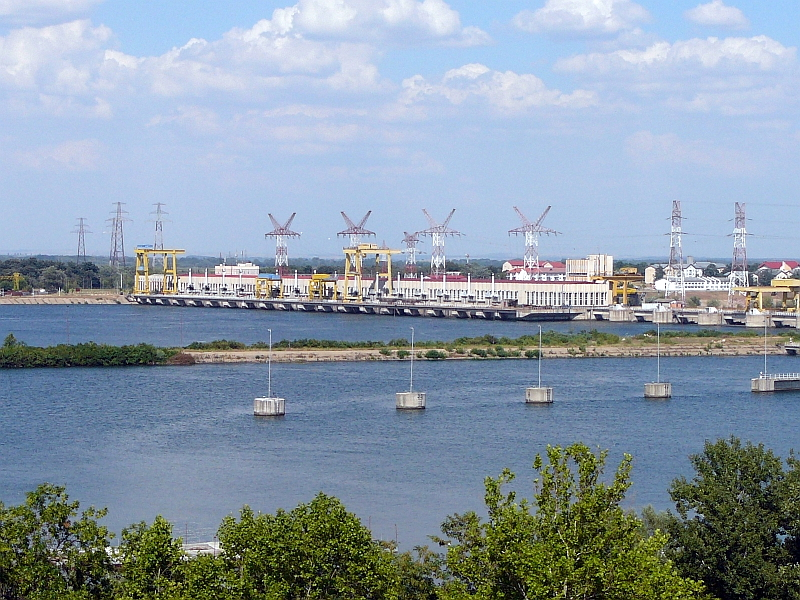
Iron Gate II Hydroelectric Power Station

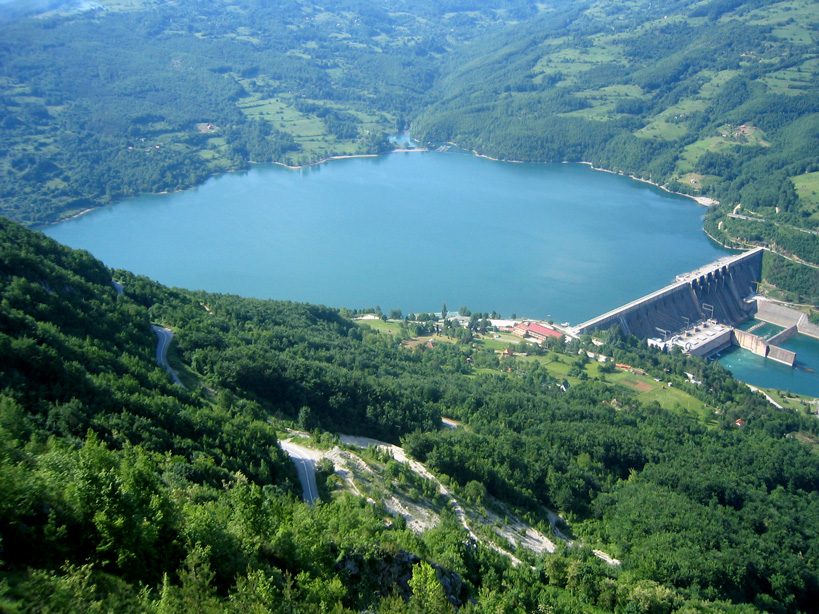
Hydroelectric Power Station of Bajina Bašta

=== Buildings in Serbia ===
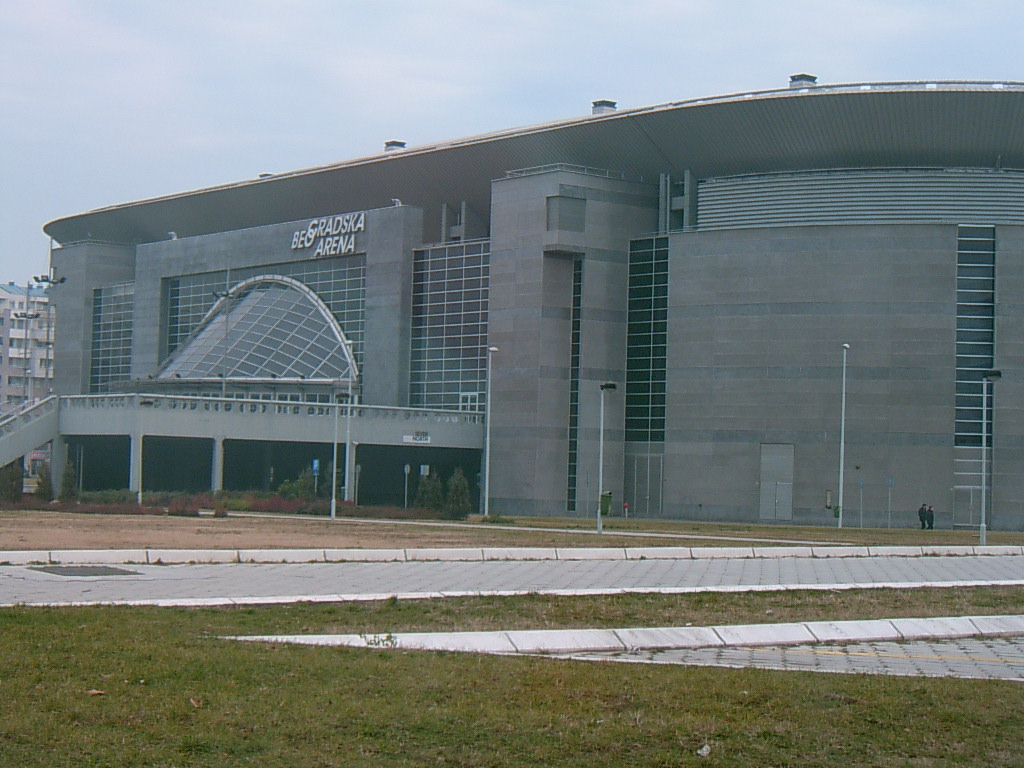
Belgrade Arena

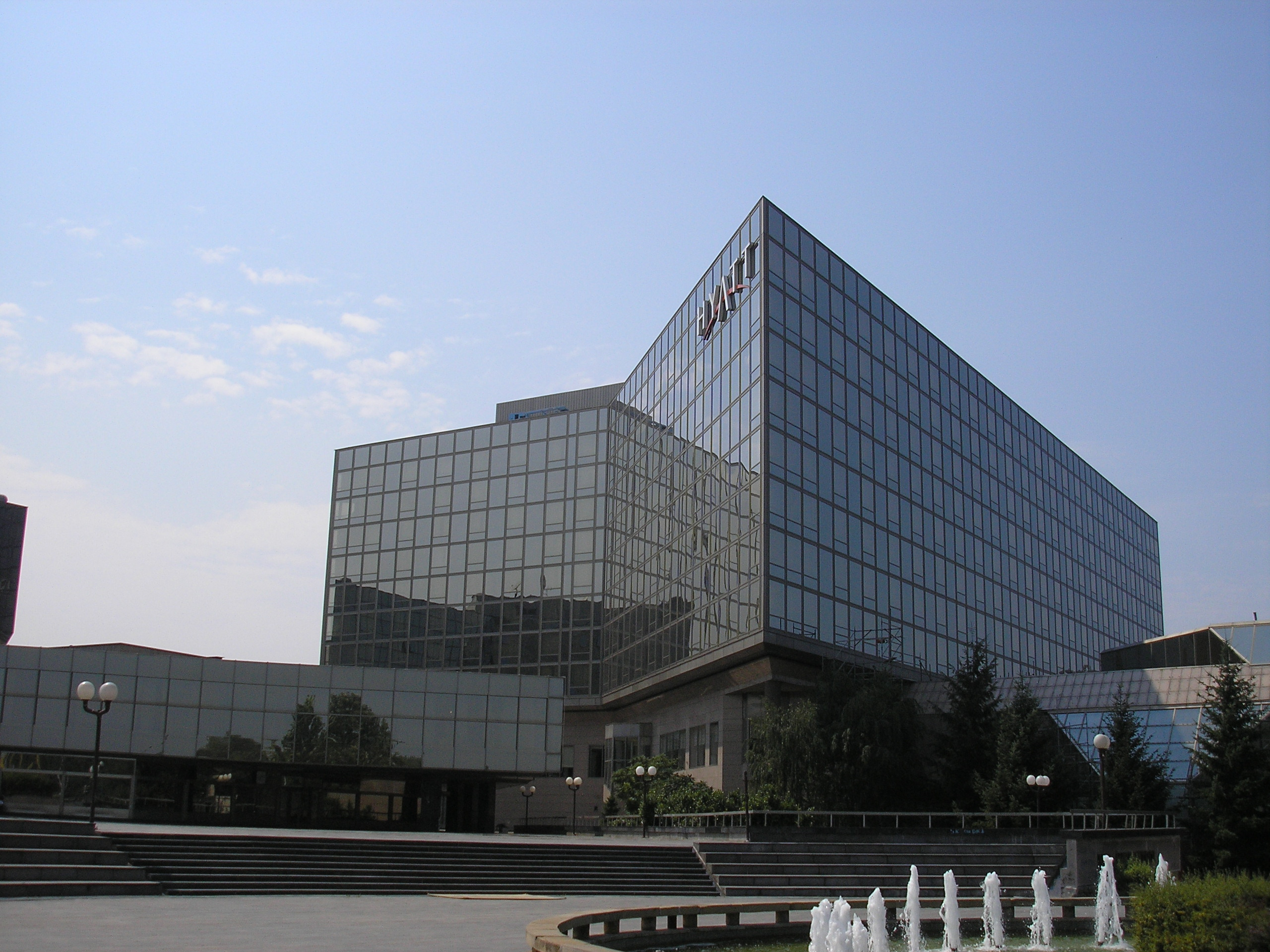
Hyatt Regency Belgrade

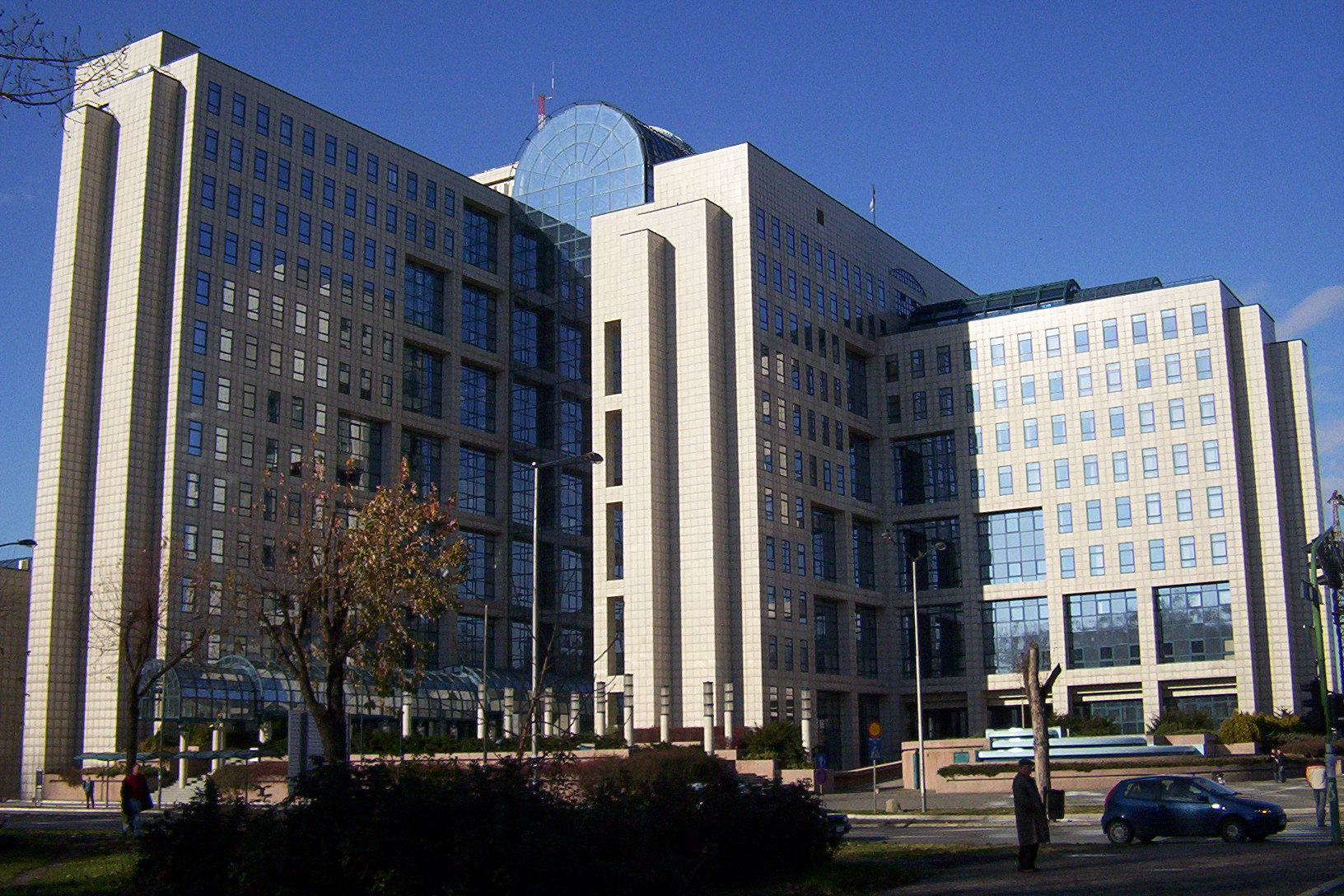
NIS headquarters in Novi Sad

== Market data ==
As of 16 May 2024, Energoprojekt holding has a market capitalization of 33.79 million euros.

== See also ==
- List of companies of the Socialist Federal Republic of Yugoslavia
