= Impol Seval =

Serbian aluminum manufacturing company

Coordinates: 43°50′24.7″N 19°53′13.6″E

- Official logo
- Native name: Импол Севал
- Company type: Joint-stock company
- Traded as: BELEX: IMPL
- Industry: Metals
- Founded: 17 January 1991; 35 years ago
- Headquarters: Prvomajska bb, Sevojno, Užice, Serbia
- Area served: Worldwide
- Key people: Ninko Tešić (General director); Sanja Bosiljčić (Executive director); Budimir Bulatović (Executive director)
- Products: Aluminium; Aluminium alloys
- Production output: 60,000 tonnes of aluminium (2017)
- Revenue: ▼€105.94 million (2018)
- Net income: ▲€7.58 million (2018)
- Total assets: ▲€106.65 million (2018)
- Total equity: ▲€53.81 million (2018)
- Owner: IMPOL d.o.o. (70.00%); Akcionarski Fond (15.00%); Other minority shareholders
- Number of employees: 534 (2018)
- Subsidiaries: Subsidiaries
- Website: www.impol.rs
- Footnotes / references Business ID: 07606265; Tax ID: 101500886

Impol Seval (Serbian: Импол Севал) is a Serbian aluminium manufacturing company headquartered in Sevojno, Užice, Serbia.

== History ==
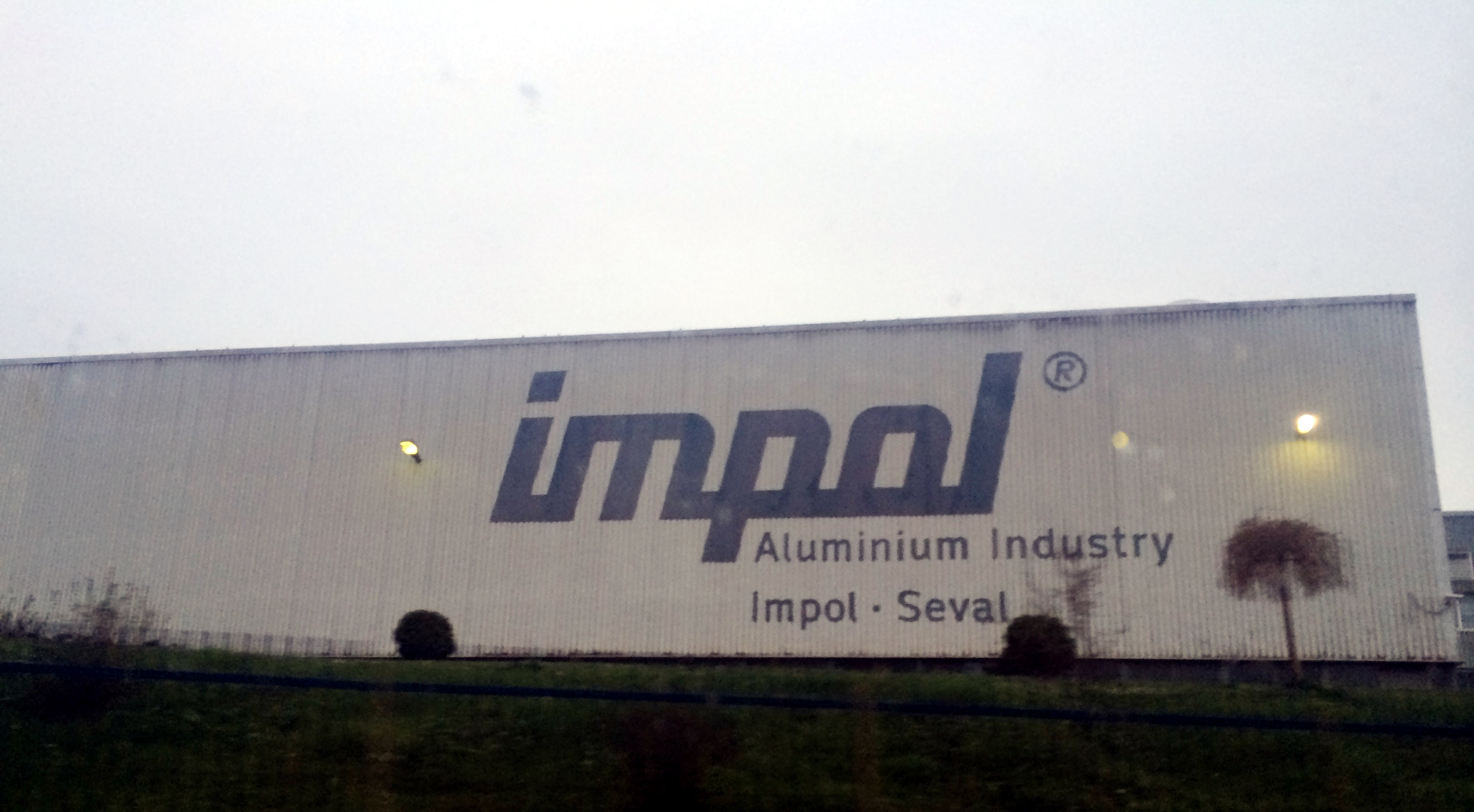
Impol Seval facility as seen from street.

From 1950 to 1989, the company operated as part of SOUR Valjaonica Sevojno. SOUR Valjaonica Sevojno was the largest copper manufacturer in the former Yugoslavia, while the aluminum production was secondary activity of the company. In 1990, it was reorganized and operated as Valjaonica bakra i aluminijuma Sevojno.

In 1991, the two mills were split from the company. The aluminum mill has operated since 17 January 1991 as independent aluminum mill Valjaonica Aluminijuma Sevojno. The other split company was the copper mill Valjaonica Bakra Sevojno. As of 2001, the company had 1,123 employees and production output of 9,159 tonnes of aluminum products.

In October 2002, the Government of Serbia sold 70% of shares of the company to the Slovenian aluminum company IMPOL d.d. Slovenska Bistrica for a sum of 6.5 million dollars, with the obligation to invest 14.6 million dollars in production facilities. By 2007, the production output increased seven times, amounting to 64,000 tonnes of aluminum products.

In 2017, Impol Seval delivered 280 tonnes of aluminum for the roof reconstruction of the Russian biggest Luzhniki Stadium, for the needs of 2018 FIFA World Cup. In November 2017, the president of IMPOL d.d. Jernej Cokl, stated that around 89 million euros has been invested in Impol Seval facilities over 15 years.

== Market and financial data ==
As of 8 March 2019, Impol Seval has a market capitalization of 23.95 million euros.

== Subsidiaries ==
This is a list of companies that operate as subsidiary of Impol Seval:

- Impol Seval Tehnika d.o.o.
- Impol Seval Final d.o.o.
- Impol Seval PKC d.o.o.
- Impol Seval President d.o.o.

== See also ==
- List of largest aluminum producers by output
- Valjaonica bakra Sevojno
