= Vranjani =

Vranjani Врањани
- Village
- Location within Serbia
- Coordinates: 43°52′13″N 19°59′29″E
- Country: Serbia
- District: Zlatibor District
- Municipality: Požega

Area
  - Total: 5.9 km^{2} (2.3 sq mi)

Population (2022)
  - Total: 373
  - Density: 63/km^{2} (160/sq mi)
- Time zone: UTC+1 (CET)
  - Summer (DST): UTC+2 (CEST)

Vranjani is a village situated in Požega municipality in Serbia. According to the 2022 census, the village has a population of 373 people.
