= Krvavci =

- Village
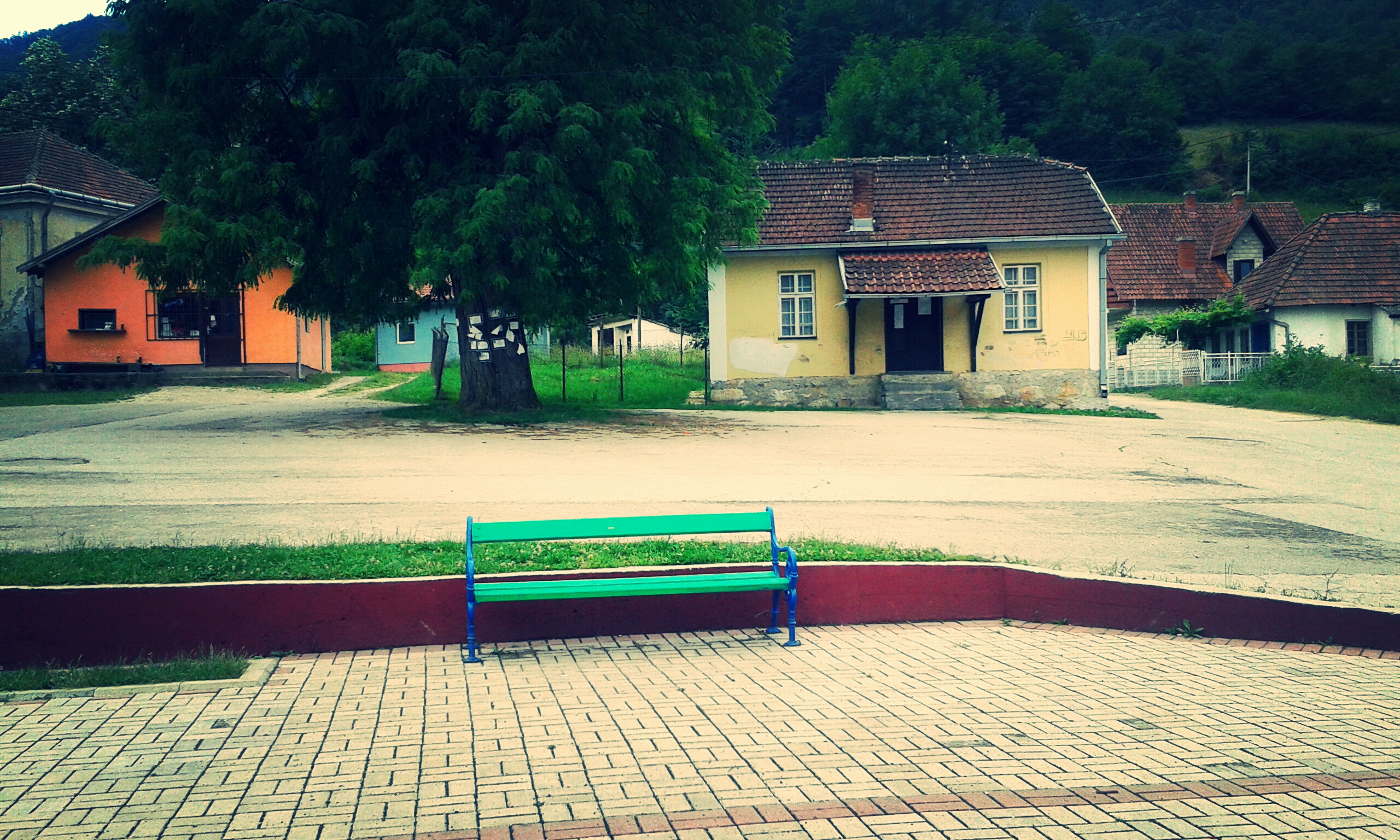
- Krvavci

- Location within Serbia
- Coordinates: 43°49′N 19°55′E
- Country: Serbia
- Time zone: UTC+1 (CET)
  - Summer (DST): UTC+2 (CEST)

Krvavci (Serbian Cyrillic: Крвавци) is a village located in the Užice municipality of Serbia. In the 2002 census, the village had a population of 311.
