= Metalac a.d. =

Serbian manufacturing company

Coordinates: 44°02′15.5″N 20°28′55.8″E

Metalac
- Official logo
- Native name: Металац
- Company type: Joint-stock company
- Traded as: BELEX: MTLC
- Founded: 21 July 1998; 27 years ago (Current form); 1959; 67 years ago (Founded)
- Headquarters: Gornji Milanovac, Serbia
- Area served: Worldwide
- Key people: Aleksandar Marković (General director); Radmila Trifunović (CEO)
- Products: Kitchen utensil
- Revenue: ▲€84.56 million (2018)
- Net income: ▼€3.82 million (2018)
- Total assets: ▲€71.15 million (2018)
- Total equity: ▲€43.42 million (2018)
- Owner: Shareholders:
- Number of employees: 2,149 (2018)
- Subsidiaries: Subsidiaries
- Website: www.metalac.com
- Footnotes / references Business ID: 07177984; Tax ID: 100887751

Metalac a.d. (Serbian Cyrillic: Металац) is a Serbian manufacturing company based in Gornji Milanovac, Serbia. With around 2,000 employees, it is one of the largest companies in Moravica District.

== History ==
Metalac was founded in 1959 in Gornji Milanovac, SFR Yugoslavia. It soon emerged as the largest Yugoslavian kitchen utensil manufacturer. Since 21 July 1998, it has operated as a joint-stock company.

Metalac has a total of 14 subsidiary companies, of which five are manufacturing companies and ten wholesale companies in Serbia and abroad.

The governing bodies of the company are the supervisory board and the board of directors. Supervisory and management boards are appointed for a period of four years. The Supervisory Board consists of experts who are important for the company's operations, while the Executive Board consists of five executive directors. The Director General shall be appointed from the Executive Board.

== Market data ==
As of 19 January 2018, Metalac a.d. has a market capitalization of 34.64 million euros.

== Subsidiaries ==
There are 14 companies that operate as subsidiaries of Metalac:

- Metalac Posudje d.o.o.
- Metalac Print d.o.o.
- Metalac Bojler d.o.o.
- Metalac Inko d.o.o.
- Metalac Fad d.o.o.
- Metalac Market d.o.o.
- Metalac Trade d.o.o.
- Metalalac Proleter a.d.
- Metalac Home Market a.d.
- Metpor d.o.o.
- Metrot o.o.o. (Russia)
- Metalac o.o.o. (Ukraine)
- Metalac Home Market d.o.o. (Croatia)
- Metalac Market d.o.o. (Montenegro)

== See also ==
- FK Metalac Gornji Milanovac, professional football club founded by Metalac workers in 1961.
- List of companies of the Socialist Federal Republic of Yugoslavia
