= Rupeljevo =

Rupeljevo Рупељево
- Village
- Location within Serbia
- Coordinates: 43°48′27″N 20°00′43″E
- Country: Serbia
- District: Zlatibor District
- Municipality: Požega

Area
  - Total: 16.5 km^{2} (6.4 sq mi)

Population (2022)
  - Total: 271
  - Density: 16.4/km^{2} (42.5/sq mi)
- Time zone: UTC+1 (CET)
  - Summer (DST): UTC+2 (CEST)

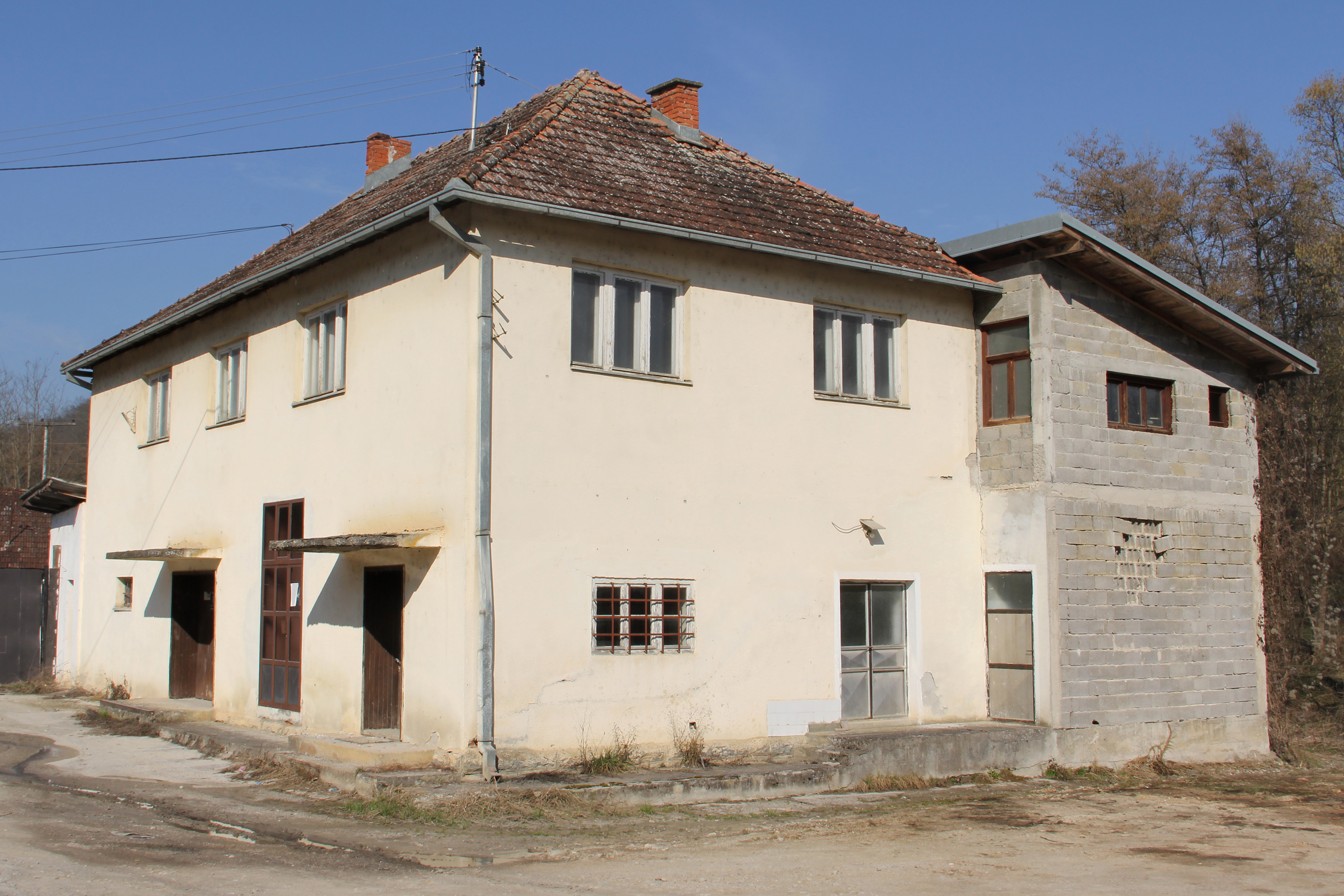
Local community building in the village of Rupeljevo

Rupeljevo is a village in the municipality of Požega, western Serbia. According to the 2022 census, the village has a population of 271 people.
