= MPP Jedinstvo =

Serbian construction company

Coordinates: 43°50′17.8″N 19°54′21.6″E

- Official logo
- Native name: МПП Јединство
- Company type: Joint-stock company
- Traded as: BELEX: JESV
- Industry: Construction
- Founded: 7 August 1991; 34 years ago (Current form); 1947; 79 years ago (Founded)
- Headquarters: Prvomajska bb, Sevojno, Užice, Serbia
- Area served: Worldwide
- Key people: Mića Mićić (General director); Radivoje Smiljanić (Executive director)
- Revenue: ▲€60.18 million (2018)
- Net income: ▼€1.38 million (2018)
- Total assets: ▼€86.48 million (2018)
- Total equity: ▼€43.42 million (2018)
- Owner: Mića Mićić (26.36%); Zeta Export-Import (7.31%); MPP Jedinstvo a.d. (6.01%); Zoran Radibratović (5.91%) Duško Đurić (5.36%); Other minority shareholders
- Number of employees: 1,150 (2018)
- Subsidiaries: Subsidiaries
- Website: mppjedinstvo.co.rs/rs/
- Footnotes / references Business ID: 07188307; Tax ID: 102136136

MPP Jedinstvo (Serbian: МПП Јединство; full name: Montažno proizvodno preduzeće Jedinstvo) is a Serbian construction company headquartered in Sevojno, Užice, Serbia.

== History ==
MPP Jedinstvo was founded in 1947 in Sevojno, SFR Yugoslavia.

After its privatization and transformation into a joint-stock company, Jedinstvo Sevojno was admitted to the free market of the Belgrade Stock Exchange on October 27, 2004.

== Activities ==
The Jedinstvo Sevojno company builds thermal and hydraulic power plants, as well as thermal or hydraulic systems. It also operates through six subsidiaries, including Jedinstvo Metalogradnja a.d., founded in 1947, which builds various metal structures designed and made to order, Užice-gas a.d., established in 2007, and Zlatibor-gas d.o.o., established in 2008, which builds gas pipelines and distributes natural gas.

Autokuća Raketa a.d. specializes in the sale of vehicles at regional level of automobiles of the Peugeot, Fiat, Zastava, Zastava kamioni and Lada brands as well as in services around the automobile, in particular cleaning and maintenance of vehicles.

== Market and financial data ==
As of 8 March 2019, MPP Jedinstvo has a market capitalization of 11.77 million euros.

== Subsidiaries ==
This is a list of companies that operate as subsidiarys of MPP Jedinstvo:

- MPP Jedinstvo Metalogradnja a.d.
- Auto Kuća Raketa a.d.
- Užice Gas a.d.
- Zlatibor Gas d.o.o.
- Metaling Eko d.o.o.
- Jedinstvo Livnica Požega d.o.o.
- Novi Put Plus d.o.o.
- Novi Pazar Put a.d.
- Tehnogrupa ABG d.o.o.
- MPP Jedinstvo d.o.o. Montenegro
- Jedinstvo Inženjering o.o.o. Russia
- MPP Jedinstvo d.o.o. Slovenia
- Feniks ICC d.o.o. Slovenia
- MPP Jedinstvo d.o.o. Kosovo
- MPP Jedinstvo BH d.o.o. Bosnia and Herzegovina
