= Zlakusa =

Zlakusa Злакуса
- Village
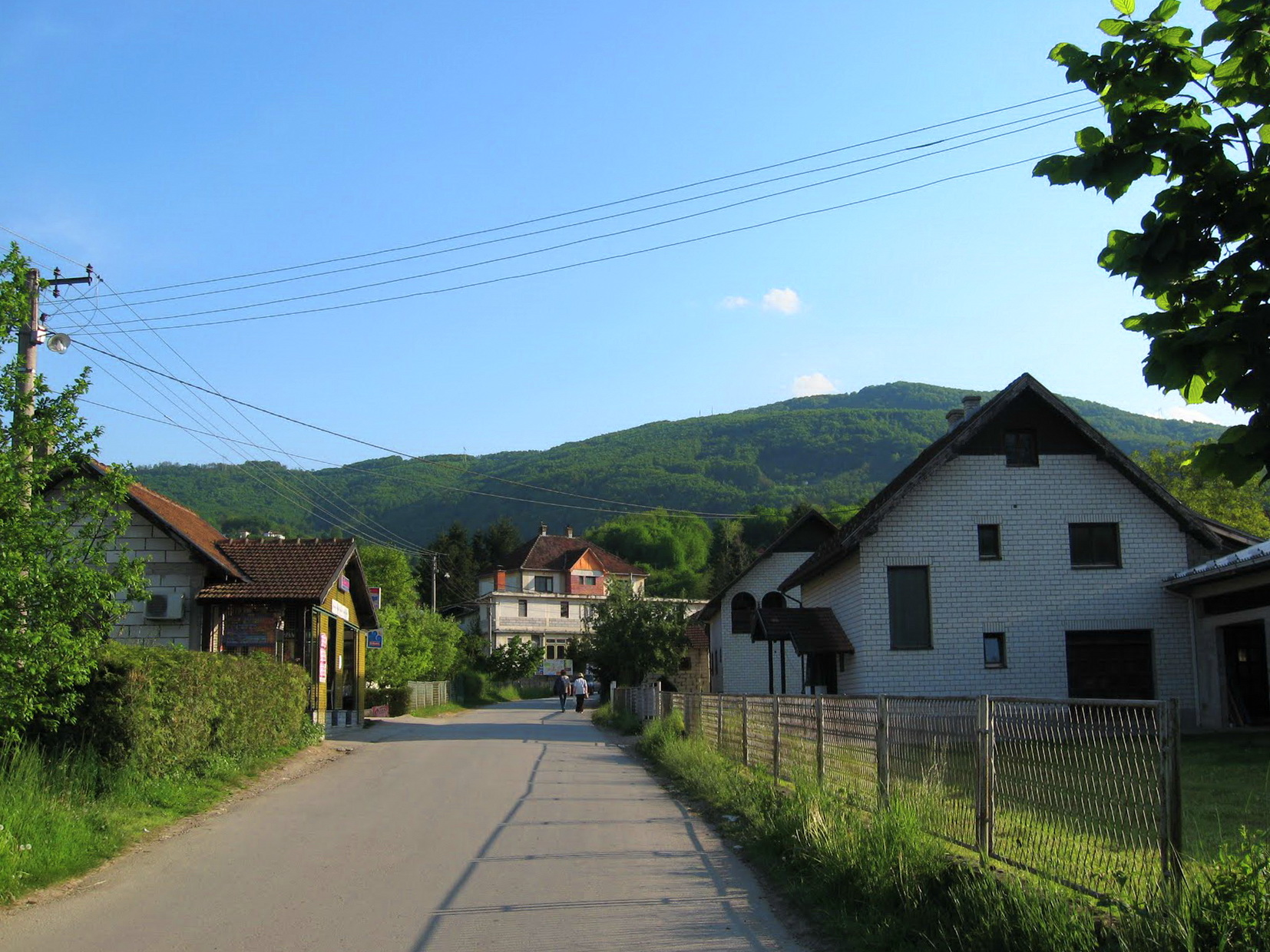
- Zlakusa Landscape

- Location within Serbia
- Coordinates: 43°48′N 19°57′E
- Country: Serbia
- District: Zlatibor District
- Municipality: Užice
- Elevation: 482 m (1,581 ft)

Population (2011)
  - Total: 671
- Time zone: UTC+1 (CET)
  - Summer (DST): UTC+2 (CEST)

Zlakusa (Serbian Cyrillic: Злакуса) is a village located in the municipality of Užice, western Serbia. As of 2011 census, the village had a population of 671 inhabitants.
