= Gorjani (Užice) =

Village in Serbia

Coordinates: 43°49′N 19°56′E

Gorjani Горјани
- Village
- Location in Serbia
- Country: Serbia
- Municipality: Užice

Population (2002)
  - Total: 735
- Time zone: UTC+1 (CET)
  - Summer (DST): UTC+2 (CEST)

Gorjani (Serbian Cyrillic: Горјани) is a village located in the Užice municipality of Serbia. In the 2002 census, the village had a population of 735.
