= Belgrade Stock Exchange =

Stock exchange located in Belgrade, Serbia

Coordinates: 44°49′19″N 20°24′47″E

- Београдска берза Beogradska berza
- Type: Stock exchange
- Location: Belgrade, Serbia
- Founded: 1894 (132 years ago)
- Key people: Lazo Ostojić (Director)
- Currency: Serbian dinar (RSD)
- No. of listings: 436 (as of February 2021)
- Market cap: ▲€4.43 billion (Feb 2021); US$5.33 billion
- Indices: BELEX15; BELEXline
- Website: bgdx.rs

The Belgrade Stock Exchange (BSE or BELEX; Serbian: Београдска берза, romanized: Beogradska berza) is a stock exchange based in Belgrade, the capital city of Serbia. The exchange was originally founded in 1894. It currently consist of 2 indices.

BELEX is an observer member of the Federation of Euro-Asian Stock Exchanges (FEAS) and a partner exchange of the Sustainable Stock Exchanges Initiative (SSE).

== History ==
The Belgrade Stock Exchange was founded in 1894, and operated continuously until 1941, during the Second World War. Following the end of the war, the old exchange was formally closed by the new communist regime in 1953. It remained closed until 1989 when it was re-established as the Yugoslav Capital Market - Belgrade. The exchange was renamed in 1992, back as it was originally known, the Belgrade Stock Exchange.

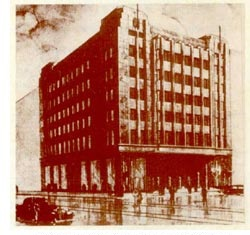
Former building of the Belgrade Stock Exchange. Today the Ethnographic Museum

In 2016, the Belgrade Stock Exchange joined SEE Link, a regional network for trading securities, supported by the European Bank for Reconstruction and Development (EBRD).

The Belgrade Stock Exchange has been a partner exchange with the Sustainable Stock Exchanges Initiative (SSE) since 2018.

In 2021, the Athens Stock Exchange (ATHEX) entered into a strategic partnership with the Belgrade Stock Exchange, to further expand and strengthen capital markets in Southeastern Europe. Additionally, ATHEX acquired a 10.24% stake in BELEX, with the latter also transitioning to the use of the ATHEX trading platform.

The exchange moved to its new headquarters in the Belgrade Centre commercial zone in 2026.

== Directors ==
- Dimitrije Stamenković 1894
- Milan Stojadinović 1941
- Gordana Dostanić 2002 – 2015
- Siniša Krneta 2015 – 2023
- Ivan Leposavic 2023 - 2024
- Lazo Ostojić 2024 –

== Indexes ==
Belgrade Stock Exchange currently has two indices:

- BELEXline, the general benchmark index of the Belgrade Stock Exchange.
- BELEX15, representing the 15 most liquid stocks.

== Regulatory bodies ==
The Belgrade Stock Exchanged is regulated by the Securities and Exchange Commission (SEC) and the Serbian Ministry of Finance.

== International Connectivity ==
Passive exposure for international investors to the BELEX15 index of the Belgrade Stock Exchange is possible through an exchange-traded fund - Expat Serbia BELEX15 UCITS ETF - listed in Frankfurt on Xetra (ticker ESNB, ISIN BGSRBBE05183) and traded in euro. The fund acts as a conduit for capital flows between the international financial markets and the Serbian capital market.

The SRX (Serbian Traded Index) is a capitalization-weighted price index calculated by Wiener Börse (Vienna Stock Exchange) that tracks the most liquid stocks on the Belgrade Stock Exchange (BELEX). Launched in 2007, it functions as a tradable index in EUR, USD, and RSD for structured products and derivatives, providing real-time data on Serbian blue chips.

== See also ==
- List of European stock exchanges
- List of companies of Serbia
- Economy of Serbia
- National Bank of Serbia
- Serbian dinar
